= Mitsubishi Delica =

Range of vans and pickup trucks

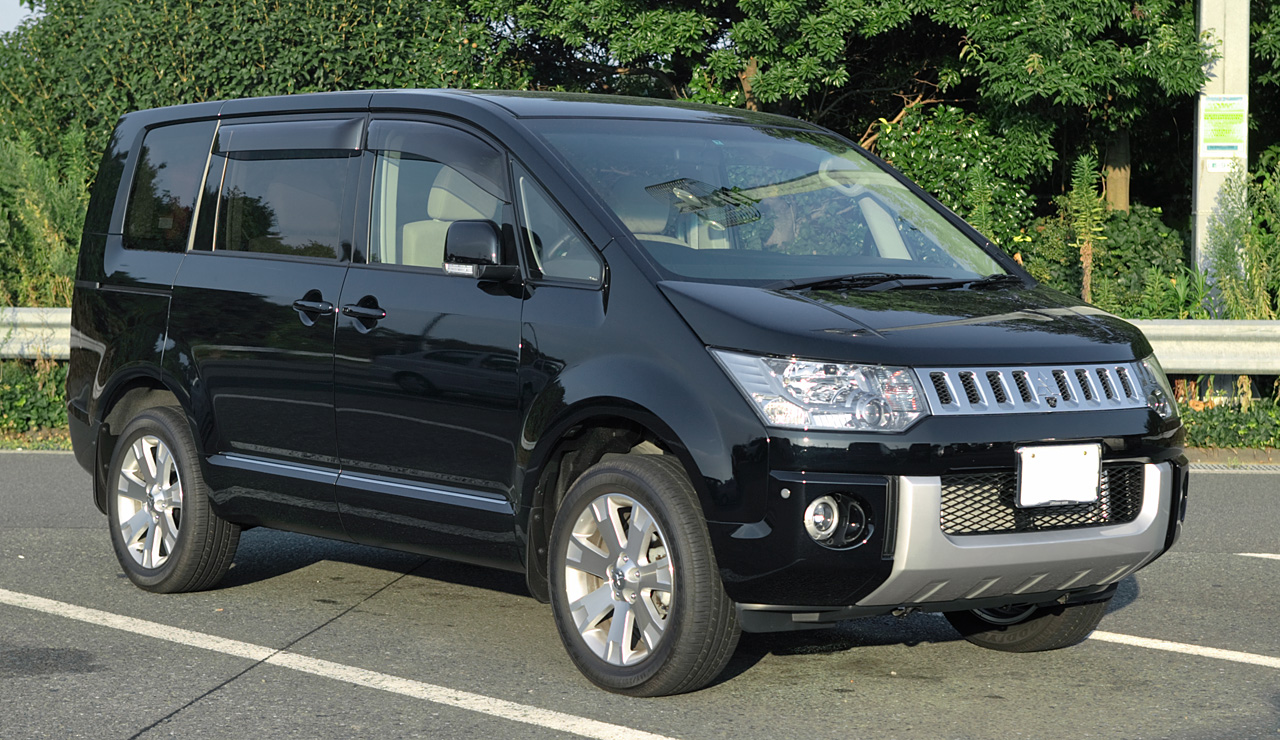

Overview
- Manufacturer: Mitsubishi Motors
- Production: 1968–present

Body and chassis
- Class: Pickup truck/Light commercial vehicle (1968–present); Minivan (1969–present)
- Layout: Front-mid engine, rear-wheel-drive (1968–present); Front-mid engine, four-wheel-drive (1979–1994); Front-engine, rear-wheel-drive (1994–present); Front-engine, front-wheel-drive (2007–present); Front-engine, four-wheel-drive (1994–present)

The Mitsubishi Delica (Japanese: 三菱・デリカ, Hepburn: Mitsubishi Derika) is a range of vans and pickup trucks designed and built by the Japanese automaker Mitsubishi Motors since 1968. It was originally based on a cabover van and pickup truck introduced the previous year, also called the Delica, its name a contraction of the English language phrase Delivery car. This pickup truck, and a commercial van derived from it has received many names in export markets, being sold as the L300 (later L400) in Europe, Jamaica (discontinued after the third generation) and New Zealand, Express and Starwagon in Australia, and plain Mitsubishi Van and Wagon in the United States. The passenger car versions were known as Delica Star Wagon from 1979 until the 1994 introduction of the Delica Space Gear, which became simply Space Gear in Europe at least. The most recent version (not available as a commercial vehicle) is called the Delica D:5. With the exception of the first, versions of all generations are still being sold in various international markets.

In Japan, the Delica Cargo and Delica D:3 nameplates were used on rebadged Mazda Bongo Brawny (between 1999 and 2010) and Nissan NV200 (between 2011 and 2019) respectively. Since 2011, the Delica D:2 nameplate has been applied to the rebadged Suzuki Solio. Starting in 2023, the Delica Mini nameplate is also used as a kei car model based on the eK X Space.

== First generation (1968) ==
First generation
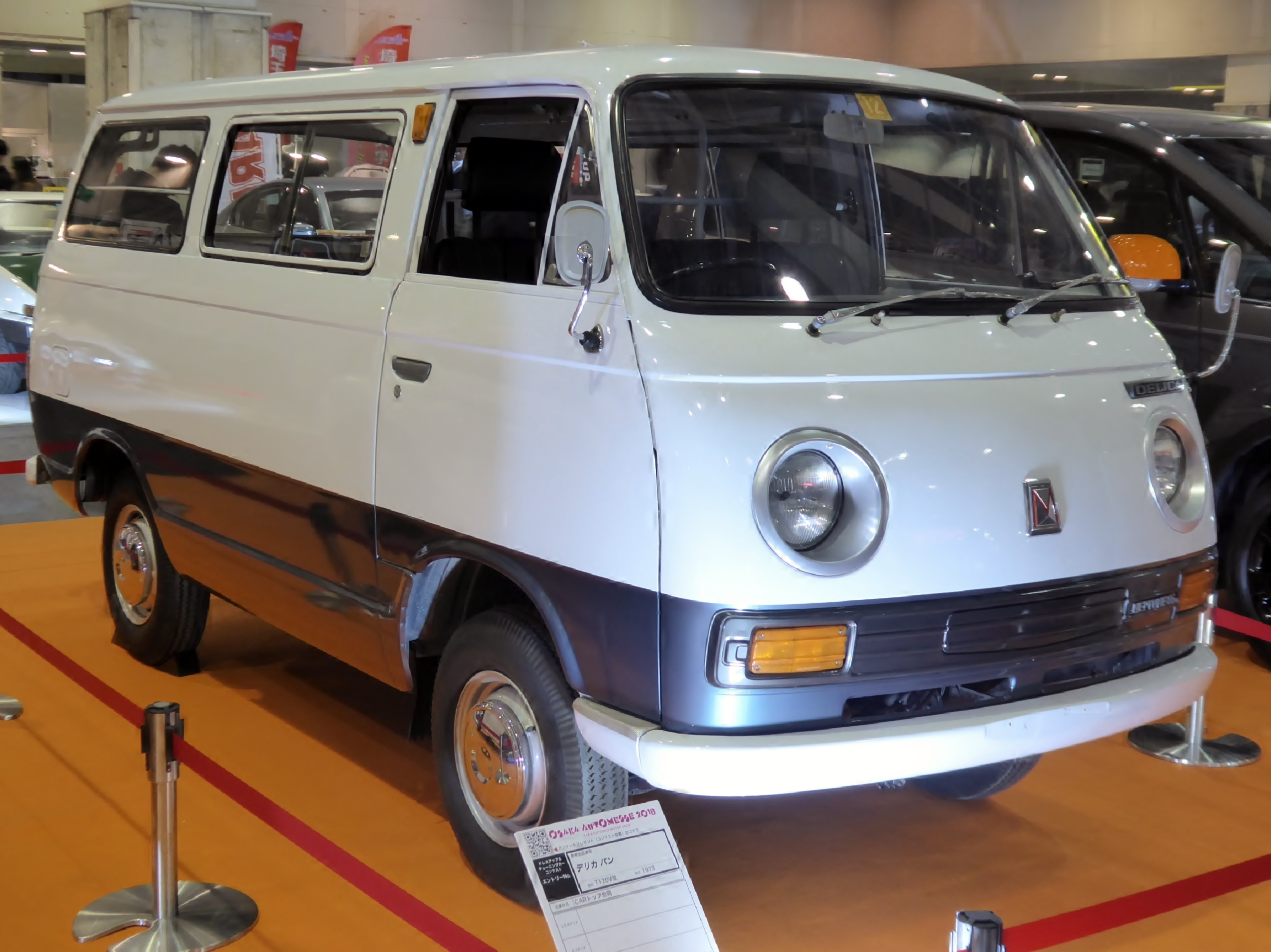

Overview
- Also called: Record GS2000 (Greece); Mitsubishi Colt T100/T120/1400
- Production: 1968–1979
- Assembly: Japan: Nagoya (Nagoya Plant); Indonesia: Pulo Gadung, East Jakarta (PT Krama Yudha Ratu Motor); Philippines: Cainta

Body and chassis
- Body style: 3-door van 2-door pickup
- Layout: front-mid engine, rear-wheel-drive

Powertrain
- Engine: 1088 cc KE44 OHV I4 (T100); 1378 cc 4G41 OHV I4 (T120)

Dimensions
- Wheelbase: 2,120 mm (83.5 in) (T100/T120); 2,270 mm (89.4 in) (T121)

The production of the Delica light commercial cab-over pickup began in July 1968. It received the chassis code T100, in line with the recently (January 1968) introduced "T90" Canter. Using a KE44 1,088 cc engine producing 58 PS (43 kW), its maximum payload was 600 kg (1,323 lb) and had a top end speed of 115 km/h (71 mph). A year later, in line with consumer needs, a cargo van and a passenger van were added to the line-up. The passenger van, discontinued in 1976, was called the 'Delica Coach' and could seat nine people in three rows of seats. The engine was upgraded to 62 PS (46 kW) in 1969.

In March 1971, a slightly facelifted version, called the Delica 75, arrived. This (the T120) received a small grille rather than the naked metal front of the earliest Delicas, and a new 1.4-litre Neptune (4G41) engine rated at 86 PS (63 kW) was added to the line-up. The smaller 1.1-litre engine may have remained available in a 600 kilograms (1,300 lb) version of the truck but if so, it soon vanished entirely.

After a fall 1974 facelift, the Delica received a new nose with much plastic cladding and double headlights, now mounted beneath the swage line. It was now known only as the "Delica 1400", as this was the only engine with which it was available (mention of a Delica 1200 is most likely apocryphal, perhaps an issue of confusion arising from the "120" chassis code). A longer wheelbase (T121) one-ton truck was added in 1976.

In export markets, this car was usually called the Colt T100/T120/1400. It became a massive success in Indonesia, where "Colt" became synonymous with minibus. Mitsubishi dominated the market and the T120 remained in production until 1982. The nametag was revived in February 1991 with a rebadged version of the Suzuki Carry Futura. Record, a Greek manufacturer of agricultural vehicles, plagiarized the Delica T120 design (even using the same windshield) for their fibreglass-bodied "GS2000" truck.

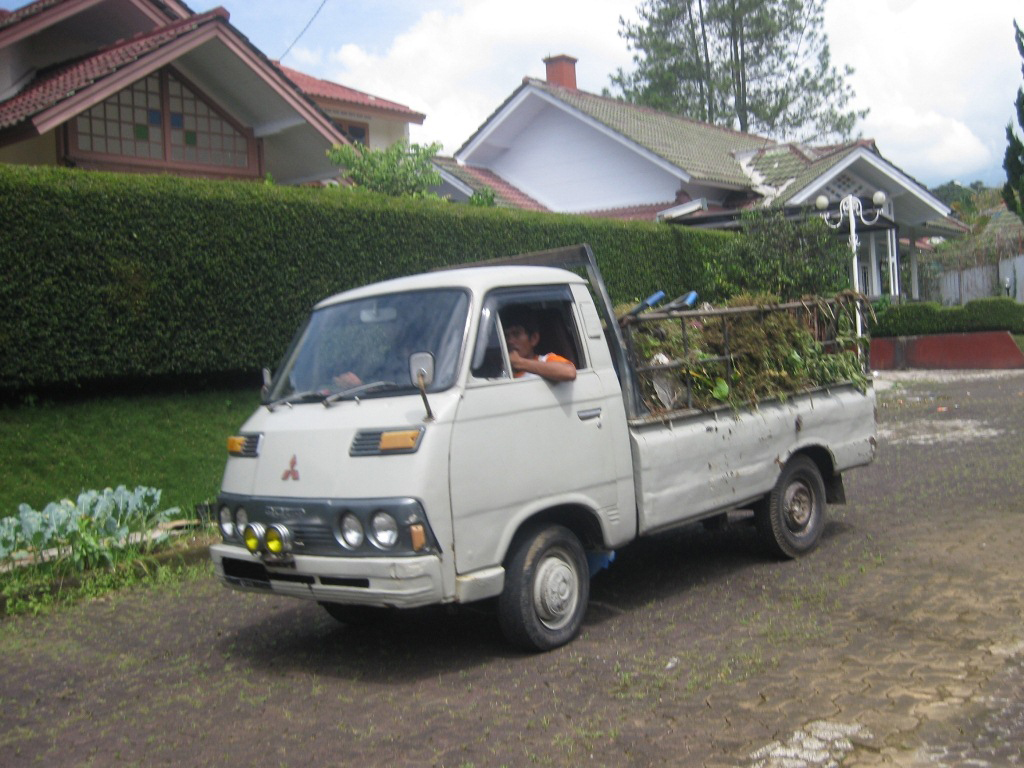
1975–1979 Colt T120, equivalent to Delica 1400 (Indonesia)

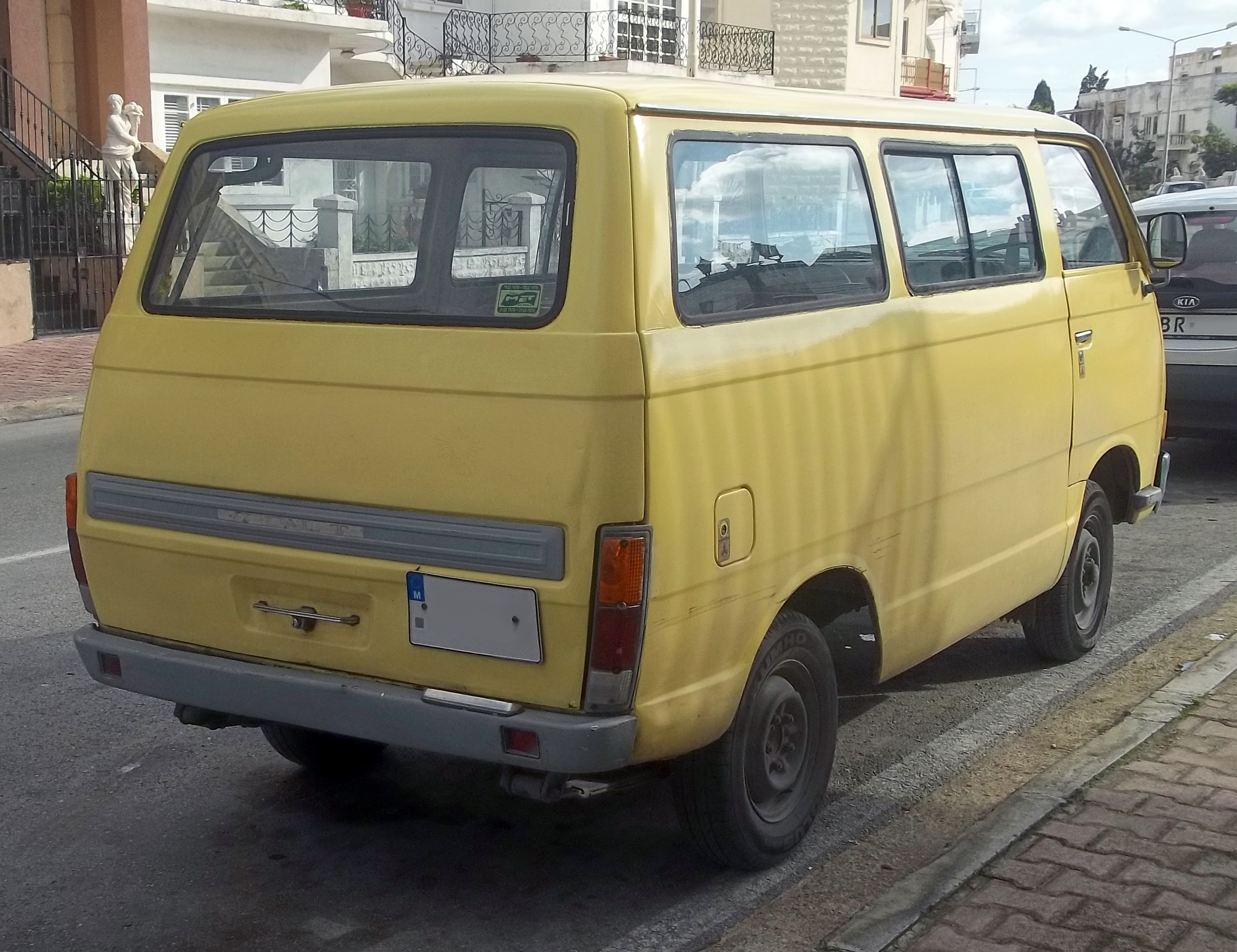
Late Colt T120 van (Malta)

== Second generation (1979) ==
Second generation
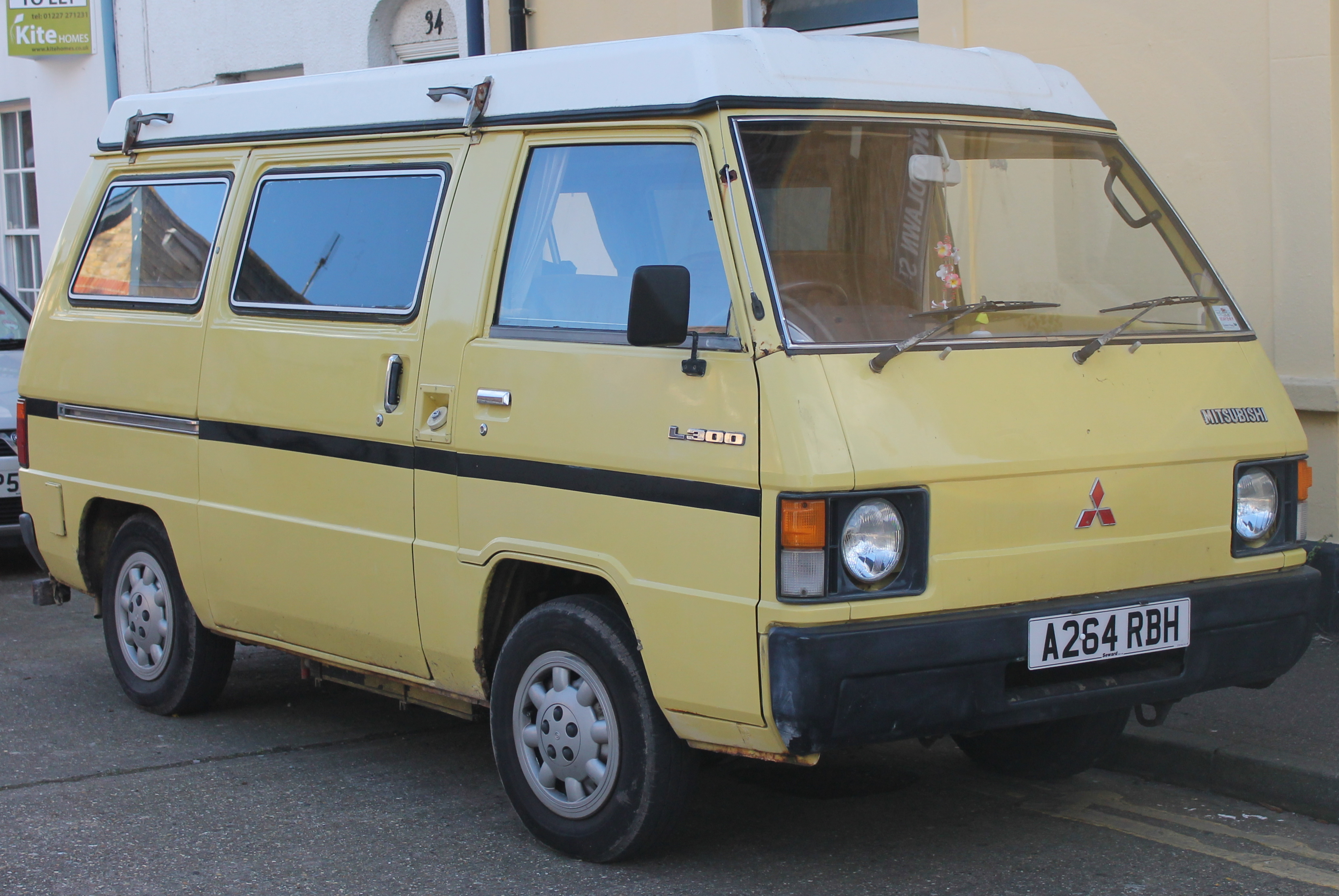
- Mitsubishi L300 van (pre-facelift, UK)

Overview
- Also called: Chrysler/Mitsubishi L300 Express (Australia); Mitsubishi L300; Mitsubishi Colt L300 (Indonesia); Ford Husky (South Africa); Hyundai Porter; Isuzu Bison (Indonesia); Mahindra Voyager (India)
- Production: 1979–1986 (van); 1979–1994 (truck); 1981–present (Indonesia); 1987–2017, 2019–present (Philippines)
- Assembly: Japan: Nagoya (Nagoya Plant); Indonesia: Pulo Gadung, East Jakarta (KRM, until 2018); Cikarang, West Java (MMKI, 2018–2022, 2023–present); South Korea: Ulsan (Hyundai, truck only); Philippines: Cainta, Rizal (Mitsubishi Motors Philippines) (until 2014); Santa Rosa, Laguna (2015–2017, 2019–present); China: Fuzhou (Forta; 1984–1986)

Body and chassis
- Body style: 2/4-door pickup; 2-door chassis cab; 4/5-door van; 4-door panel van
- Layout: Front-mid engine, rear-wheel-drive; Front-mid engine, four-wheel-drive
- Related: Mitsubishi Pajero (first generation)

Powertrain
- Engine: Petrol: 1.4 L 4G33 I4; 1.6 L 4G32 I4; 1.8 L 4G62 I4; 2.0 L 4G63/G63B I4; Diesel: 2.2 L 4N14 DOHC 16V TD I4 (2019–present); 2.3 L 4D55 I4 (1982–1986); 2.5 L 4D56 I4 (1986–2022); 2.5 L XD3P OHV I4 (Mahindra Voyager, India); 2.5 L 4JA1-L OHV TD I4 (Isuzu Bison, Indonesia)
- Transmission: 3-speed automatic; 4/5-speed manual

Dimensions
- Wheelbase: SWB: 2,200 mm (86.6 in); LWB: 2,350 mm (92.5 in)
- Length: SWB: 4,000–4,195 mm (157.5–165.2 in); LWB: 4,260 mm (167.7 in); Van: 4,445 mm (175.0 in)
- Width: Van: 1,670–1,690 mm (65.7–66.5 in); Pickup: 1,695–1,700 mm (66.7–66.9 in)
- Height: Van: 1,820–1,990 mm (71.7–78.3 in); Pickup: 1,795–1,845 mm (70.7–72.6 in)
- Curb weight: 930–1,165 kg (2,050.3–2,568.4 lb) (RWD)

Chronology
- Successor: Isuzu Traga (for Isuzu Bison)

The Delica series was replaced in June 1979 by an all new design, bringing overall width up to the maximum 1,690-millimetre (67 in) dictated by Japanese regulations for "compact" vehicles. Suspended at the front by an independent wishbone construction and a leaf spring at the rear, the Delica also features sliding side doors and a one-piece tailgate with gas struts. The line-up was expanded to include ten model variations encompassing a wide variety of passenger (eight seats in a three/two/three configuration), cargo and recreational applications. A four-wheel drive option was made available in 1982, a first in the Japanese van market. Engines were all four-cylinders well known from MMC's passenger cars and included the 1,439 cc, 80 PS (59 kW) Saturn (4G33) and 1.6-litre Saturn (4G32) engines. A 1.8-litre Sirius (4G62) version producing 100 PS (74 kW) appeared in May 1980, and a 2.0-litre Sirius (4G63B) petrol version became optional in 4WD versions from November 1983. A 2.3-litre Astron (4D55) diesel appeared in October 1982 and was replaced by the larger 2.5-litre Astron (4D56) in 1986.

The four-wheel drive version of the Delica was first introduced to the Japanese market in October 1982. This vehicle utilized a modified version of the Pajero's chassis, albeit usually with smaller engines (originally only the 1.8-litre petrol). After the introduction of the third generation Delica, the truck (separate cab) version of the second generation continued to be built until 1994. Japanese consumers were liable for higher amounts of annual road tax due to the larger engines installed in higher trim level packages.

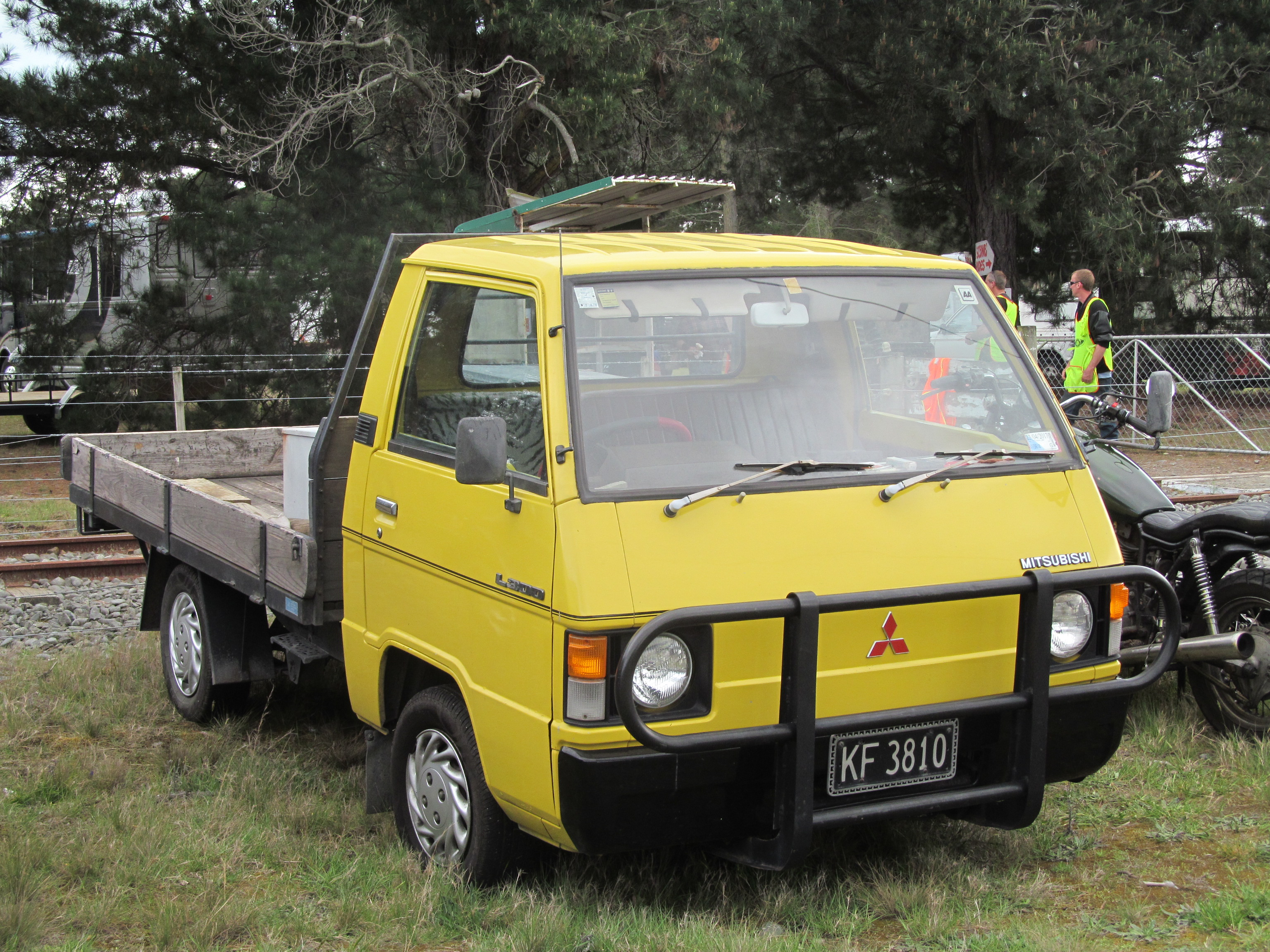
Pre-facelift Mitsubishi L300 pickup (New Zealand)

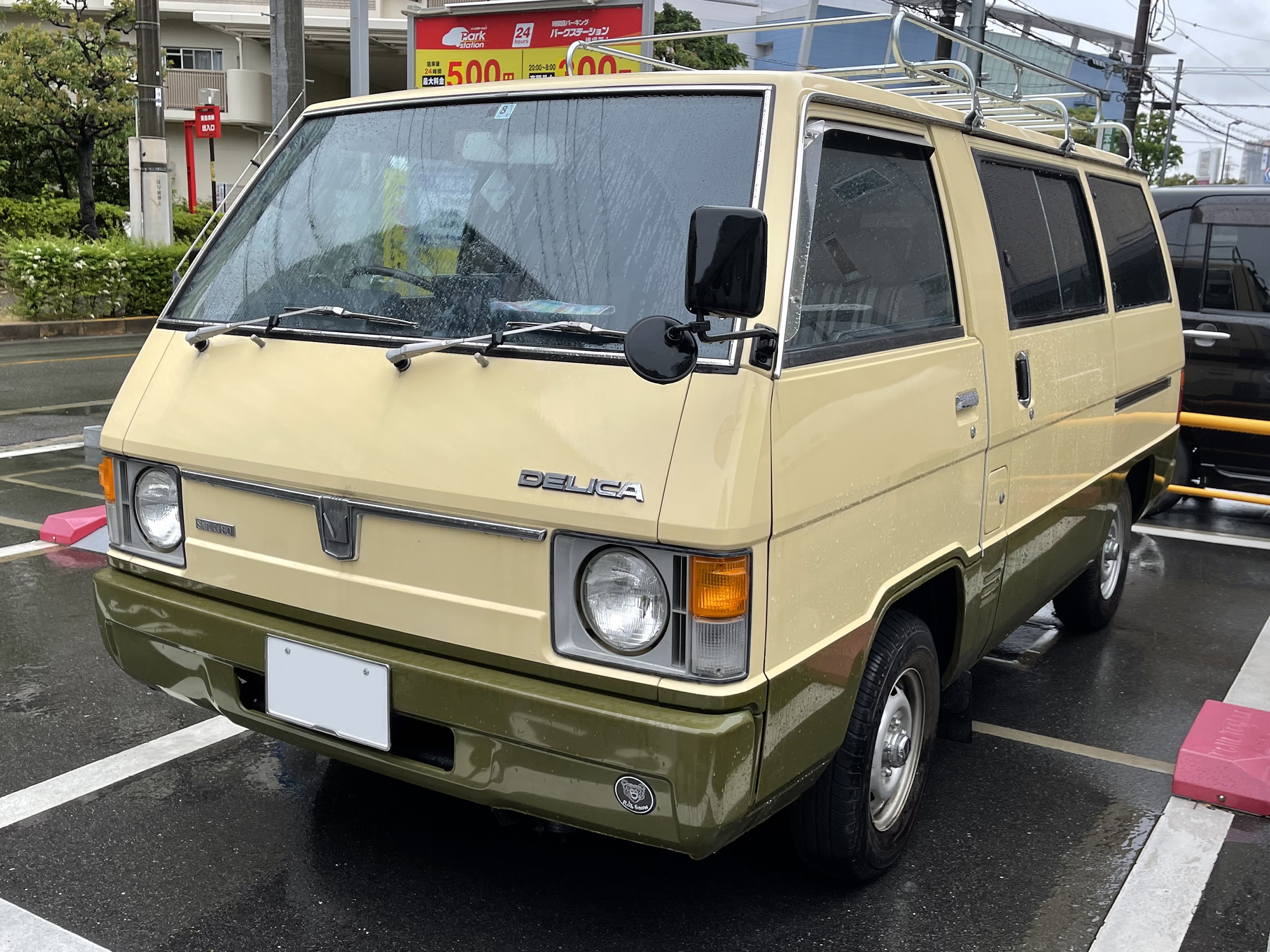
Pre-facelift Mitsubishi Delica Star Wagon (Japan)

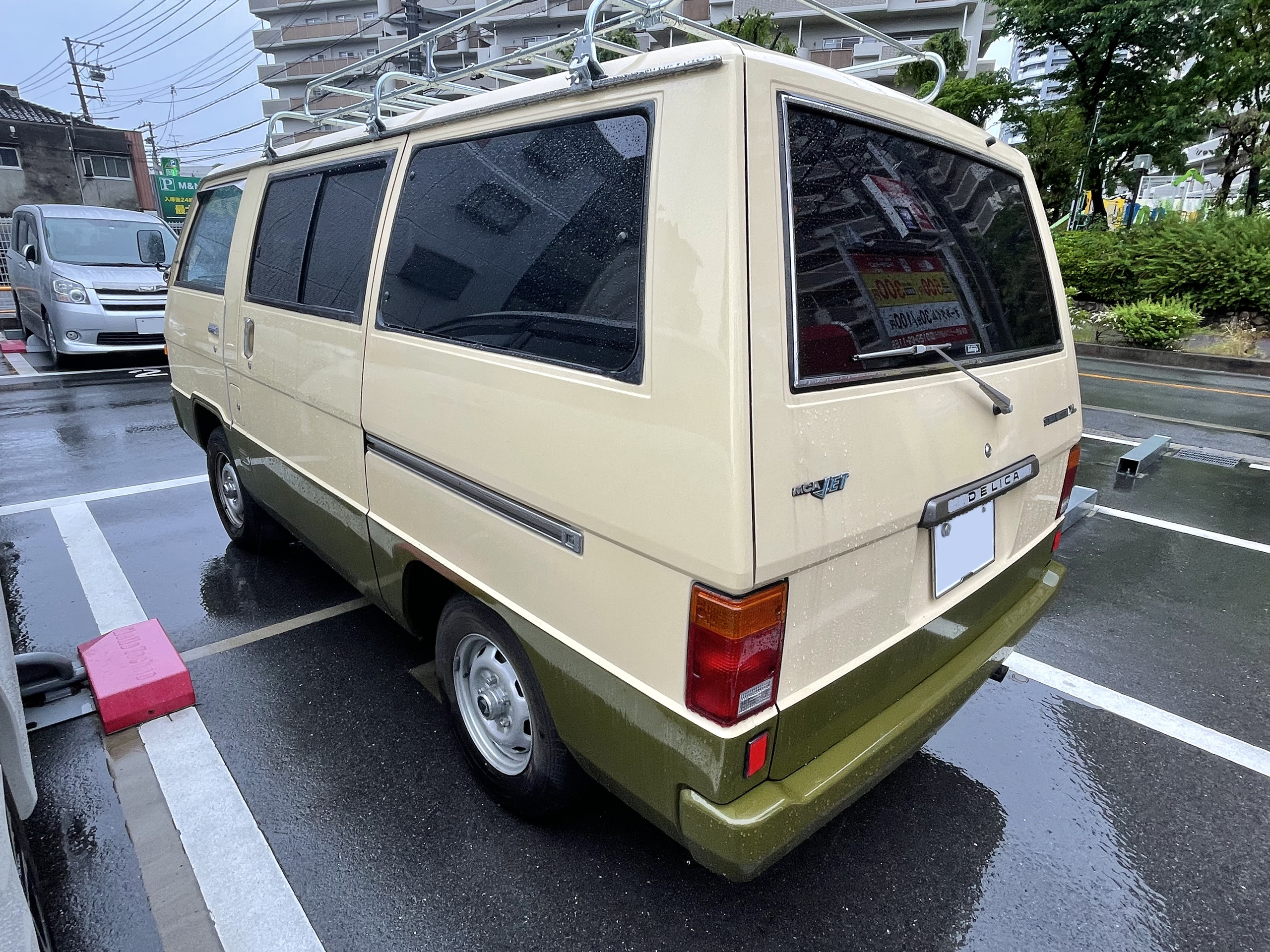
Pre-facelift Mitsubishi Delica Star Wagon (Japan)

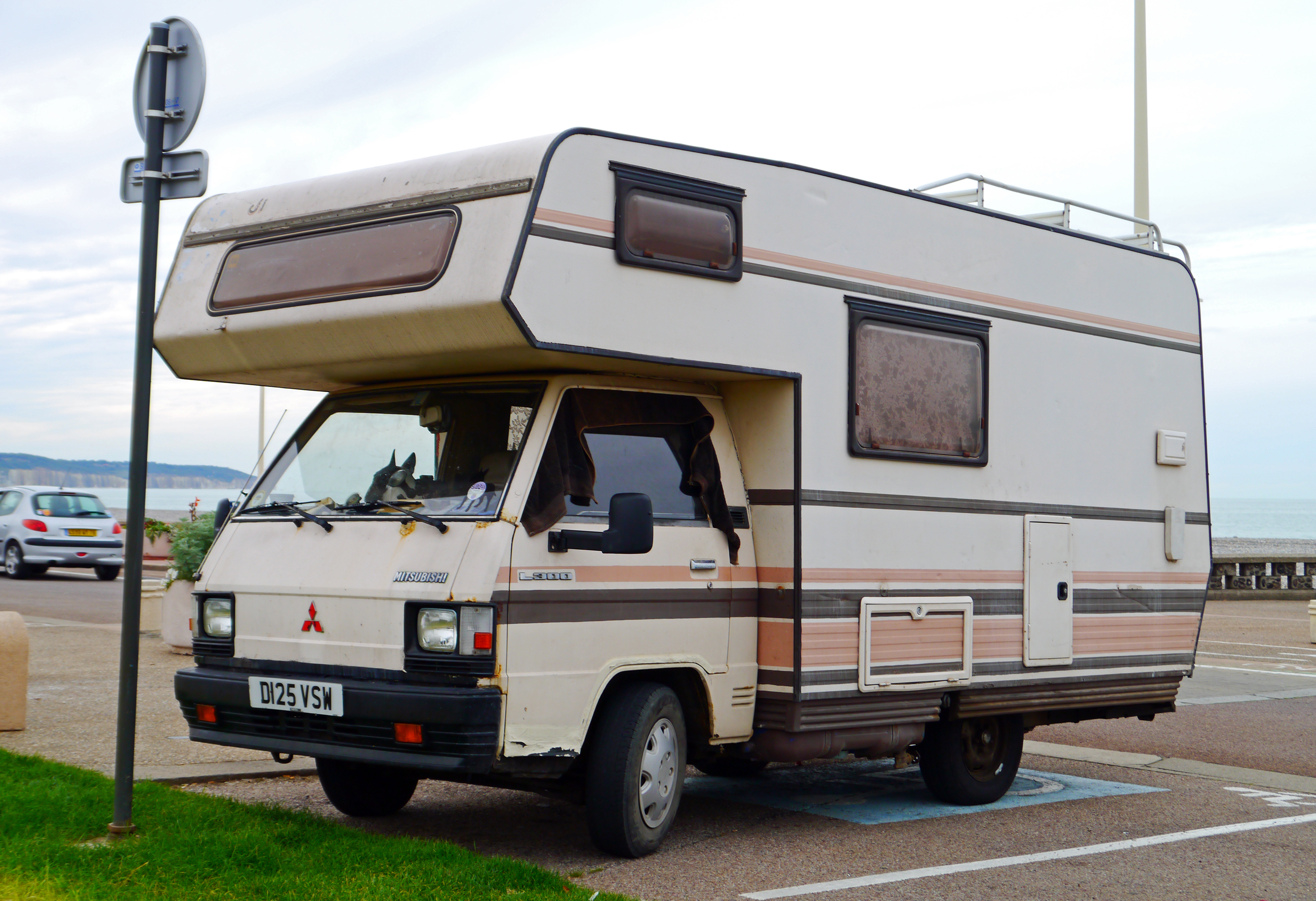
First facelift Mitsubishi L300 converted to a recreational vehicle (Europe)

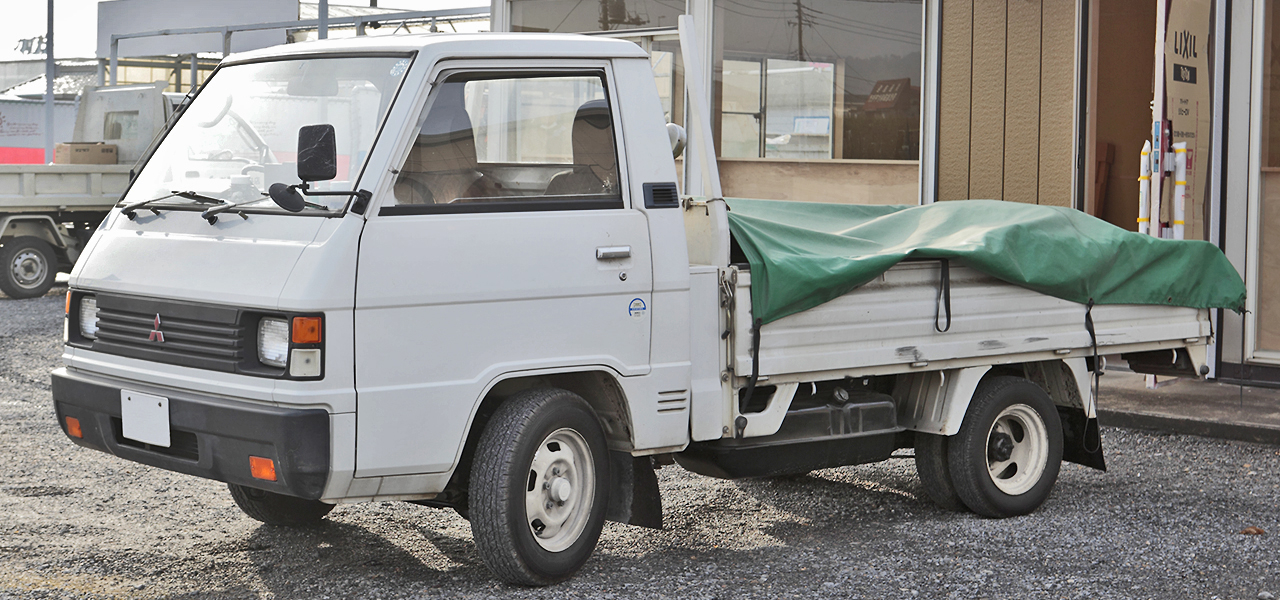
Second facelift Mitsubishi Delica pickup (Japan) with double rear tires intended for heavier payload duty

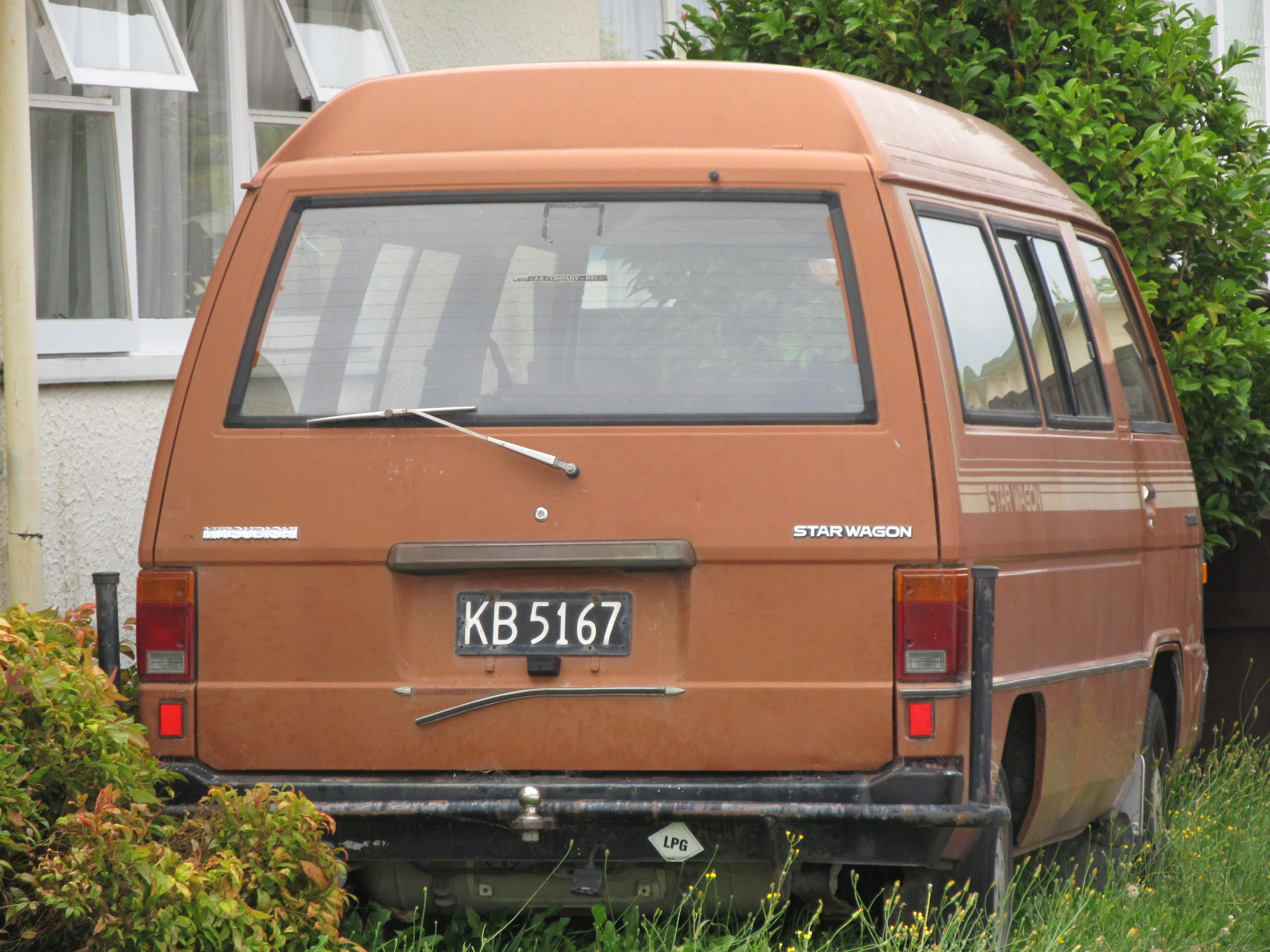
Mitsubishi L300 Star Wagon 4-door high roof van (New Zealand)

=== Markets ===
==== Australia ====
Chrysler Australia introduced the SA series Delica to the Australian market on 14 April 1980 under the name "Chrysler L300 Express" after debuting at the Adelaide Motor Show on 12 April. After acquiring control of the Chrysler Australia operations in the same month, Mitsubishi Motors renamed the firm Mitsubishi Motors Australia in October 1980. This resulted in the rebranding of the L300 Express as a Mitsubishi. Fitted with a 1.6-litre engine and four-speed manual, both van (three-seater commercial) and wagon (eight-seater) variants were offered, with the commercial (van) version available with or without side rear windows. The utility (pickup) version was not sold in Australia, as the L200 Express covered that segment of the market. In November 1981 the SB series was introduced, now fitted with radial ply tires on larger diameter wheels, thus increasing the payload capacity from 925 to 1,000 kilograms (2,039 to 2,205 lb). The following month, Mitsubishi introduced the high-roofed luxury "Deluxe" trim, fitted with electric sunroof and cloth upholstery. The next update to the SB series arrived in October 1982, resulting in the "Deluxe" trim being renamed "Starwagon" and gaining a larger 1.8-litre engine—offered with a five-speed overdrive manual or optional three-speed automatic. The "Star Wagon" (this was written either as one or as two words) moniker was also used on examples assembled by Todd Motors in New Zealand, albeit with the 65 PS (48 kW) 1.6-litre engine. Mitsubishi extended the availability of the 1.8-litre engine to the lower-specification variants, albeit in automatic guise only. The 1.8 was also available in the long wheelbase, high roof, panel van version.

From May 1983, the L300 Express received rectangular headlights in chrome surrounds as part of the SC iteration. The SC also featured newly designed black resin bumpers and adjustments to the front suspension spring rate to improve ride and handling. The four-wheel drive version, badged "4WD", came in October 1983 as a 1.8-litre model with floor-mounted five-speed manual only, therefore becoming a seven-passenger model by losing the front-row center seat. After another facelift in October 1984, the car became the SD series, introducing better equipment and black headlight surrounds along with a black trim piece between the headlights on "Starwagon" and "4WD" trims. The SD revision also upgraded the "4WD" to a 2.0-litre engine, with the 1.8-litre standard issue in a new long-wheelbase commercial (van) model. A final minor update, the SE series appeared in 1986.

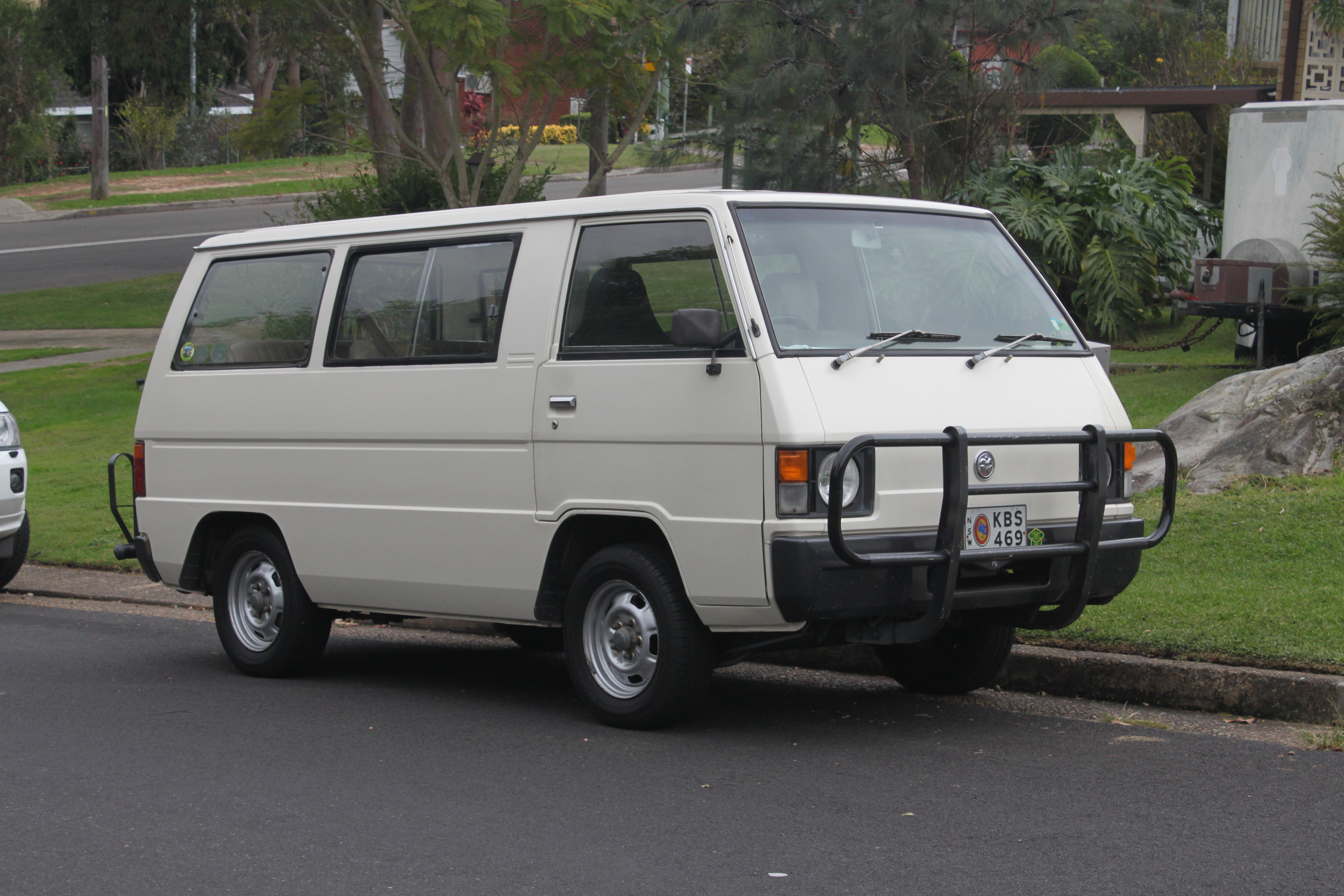
Mitsubishi L300 Express van (SB, Australia)

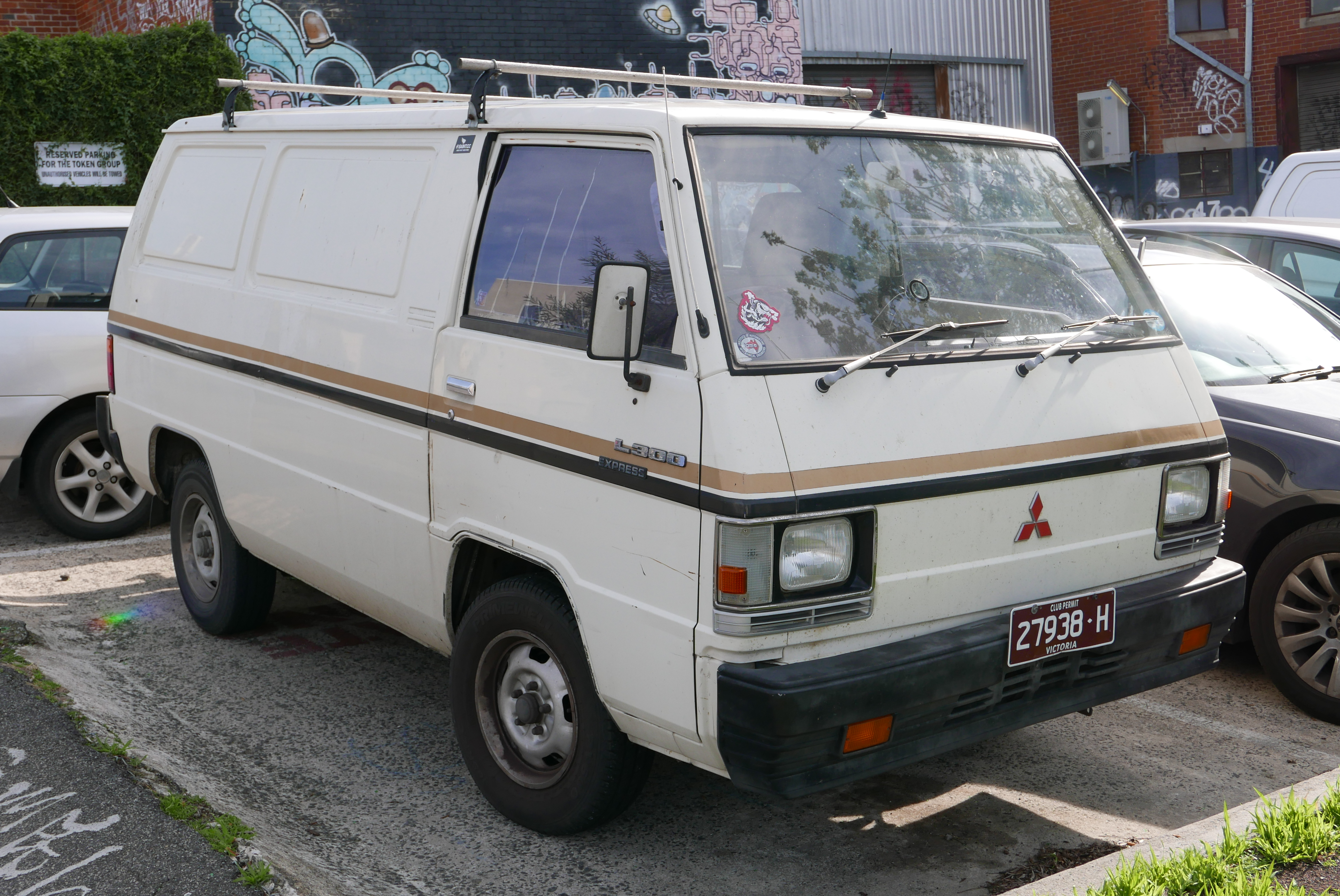
1985 Mitsubishi L300 Express panel van (SD, Australia)

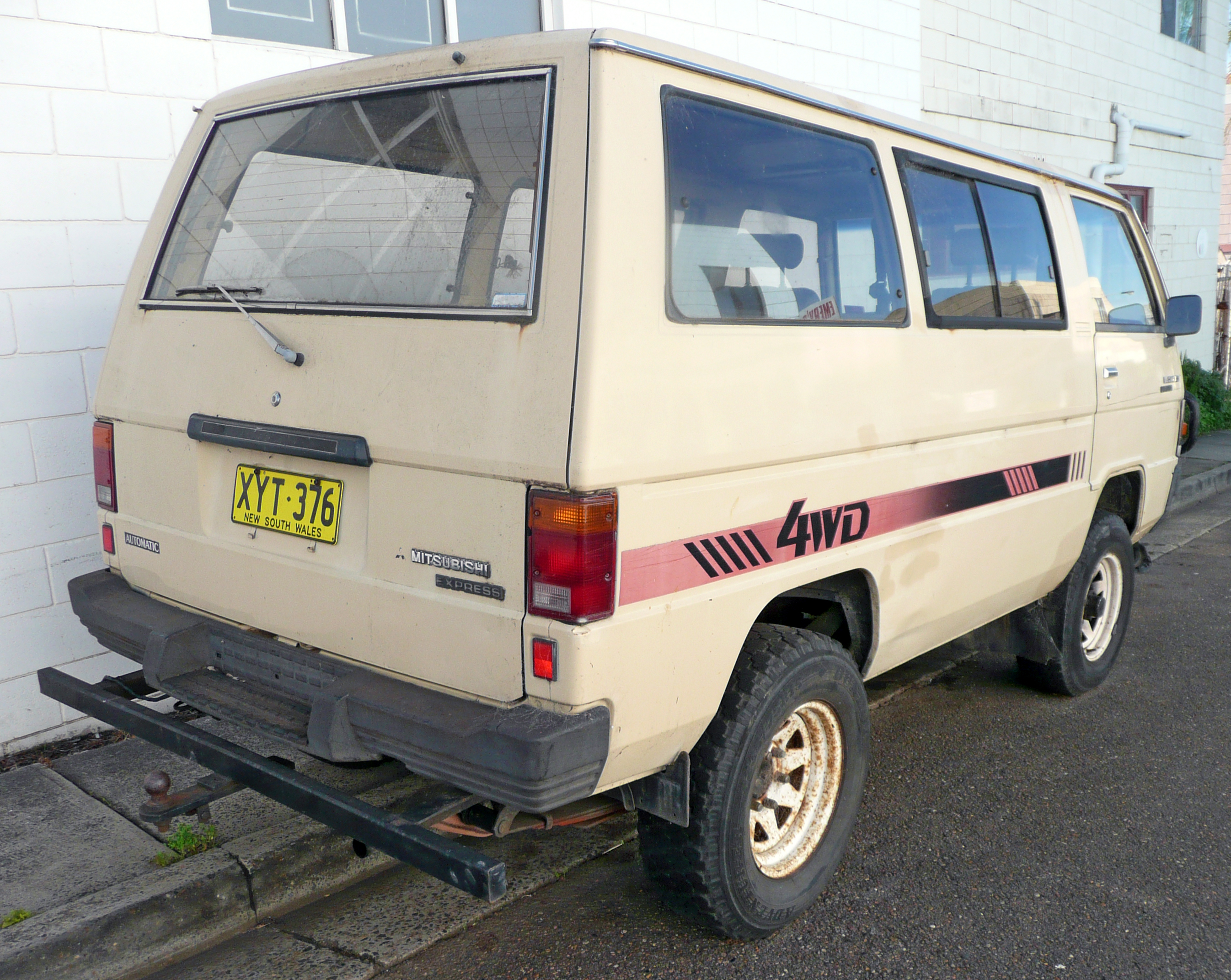
Mitsubishi L300 Express 4WD van (SD, Australia)

==== Asia ====
Philippines

This generation has been produced in the Philippines since 1987 as the "Mitsubishi L300 Versa Van" (discontinued in April 2012) as well as the Cab/Chassis variant where local coach builders assemble rear bodies for passenger and cargo hauling purposes. Variations such as the FB (family business), PET (personnel and equipment transport), WT (water tight aluminum van) and DS (drop side) have been made to cater to those needs. In 2010, an extended rear body variant for the FB variant called the Exceed was added. In 2014, local truck body manufacturer Centro Manufacturing launched a minibus version of the L300 called the XV Mikrobus. It is built on the FB Exceed platform and is meant to be used as a public utility vehicle, a school bus, or an ambulance. It is also meant to revive the Versa Van and to be an alternative to the FB variant. In 2017, Mitsubishi Motors Philippines announced that the L300's diesel engine will be updated to comply with the Euro 4 standardization project of the DENR and the LTFRB. In April 2019, Mitsubishi Motors Philippines announced that the L300 would be fitted with the 4N14 CRDi engine complied with Euro 4 Emission standards. From 1987 to 2009, the design of the front fascia has changed very little (although there were minor changes to the interior). The L300 received a facelift in 2010 and was sold until 2017. Mitsubishi updated the styling of the L300 for the 2019 model year, now featuring a new horizontal chrome grille similar to the "Dynamic Shield" design language found on other Mitsubishi models like the Mitsubishi Xpander and Mitsubishi Montero Sport to distinguish it from older L300s.

In 2020, the local production of the L300 reached 200,000 units. Exports began in April 2022 for Southeast Asian markets, particularly in Indonesia.

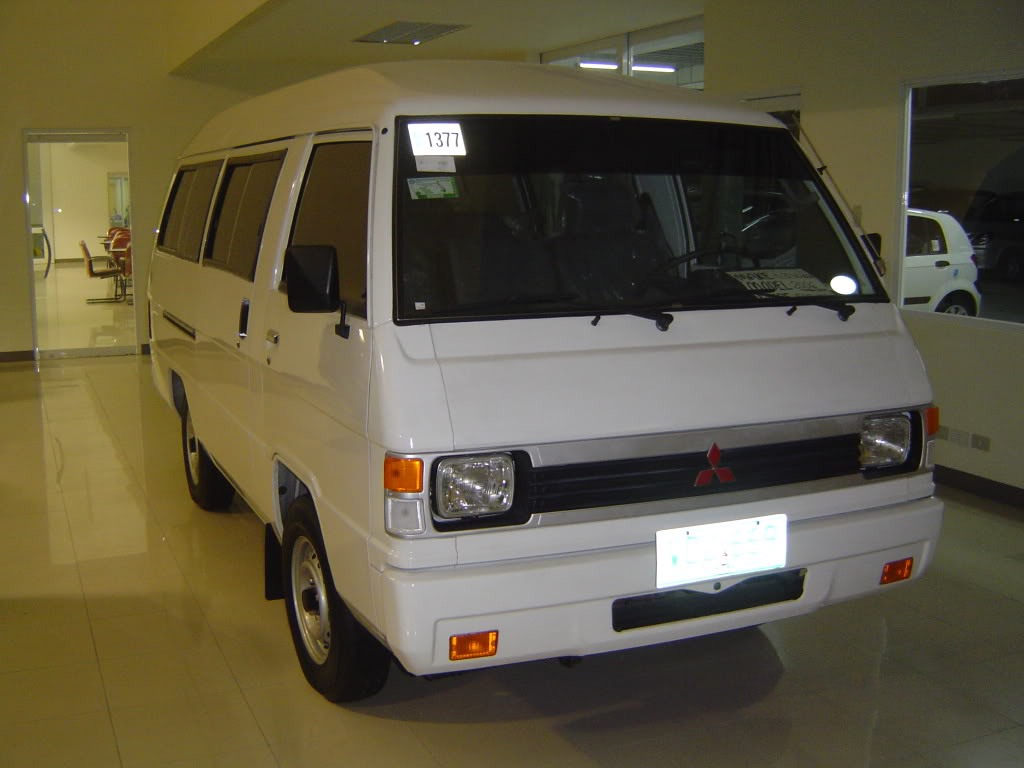
Mitsubishi L300 Versa Van (later pre-facelift model, Philippines)

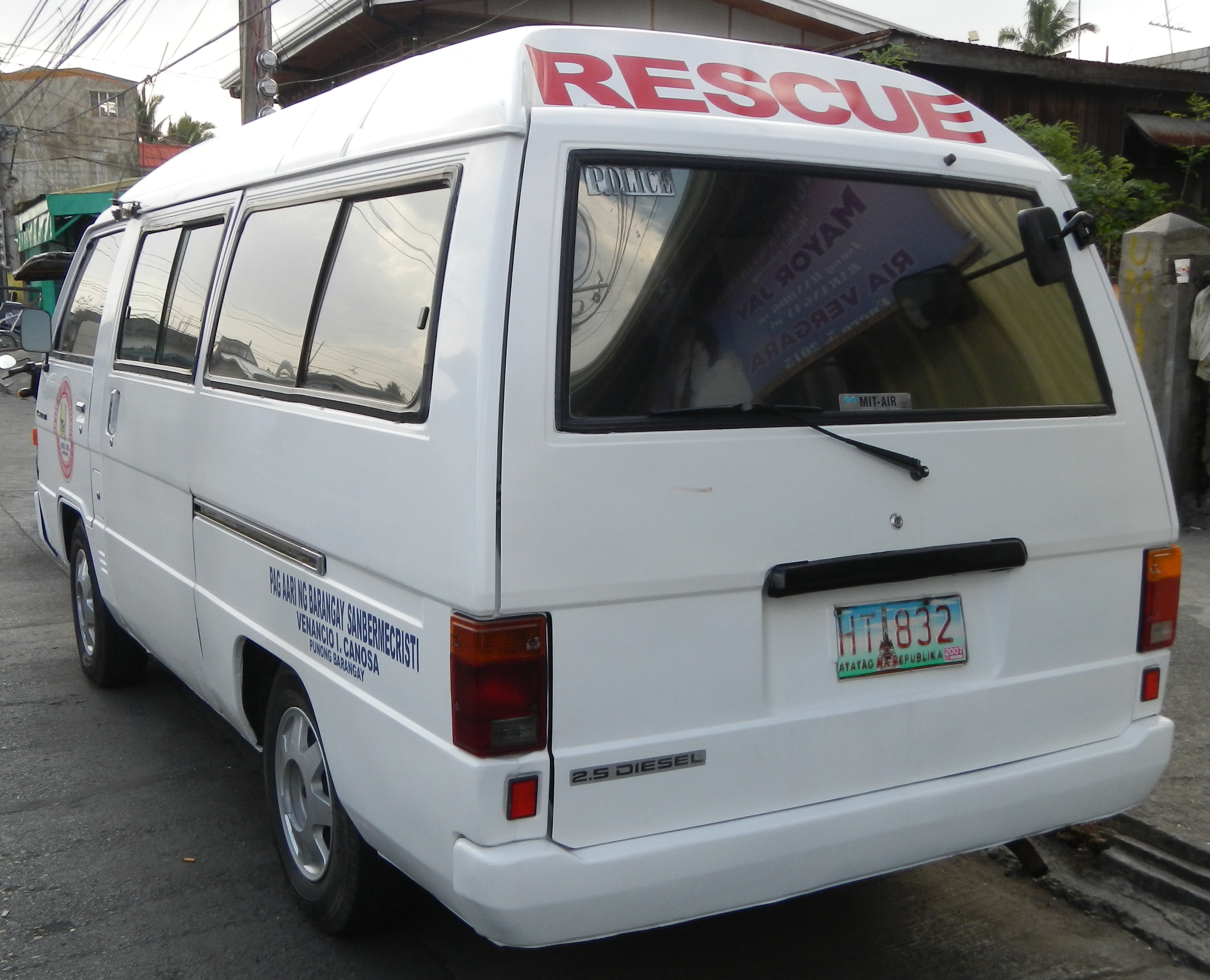
Mitsubishi L300 Versa Van (early pre-facelift model, Philippines)

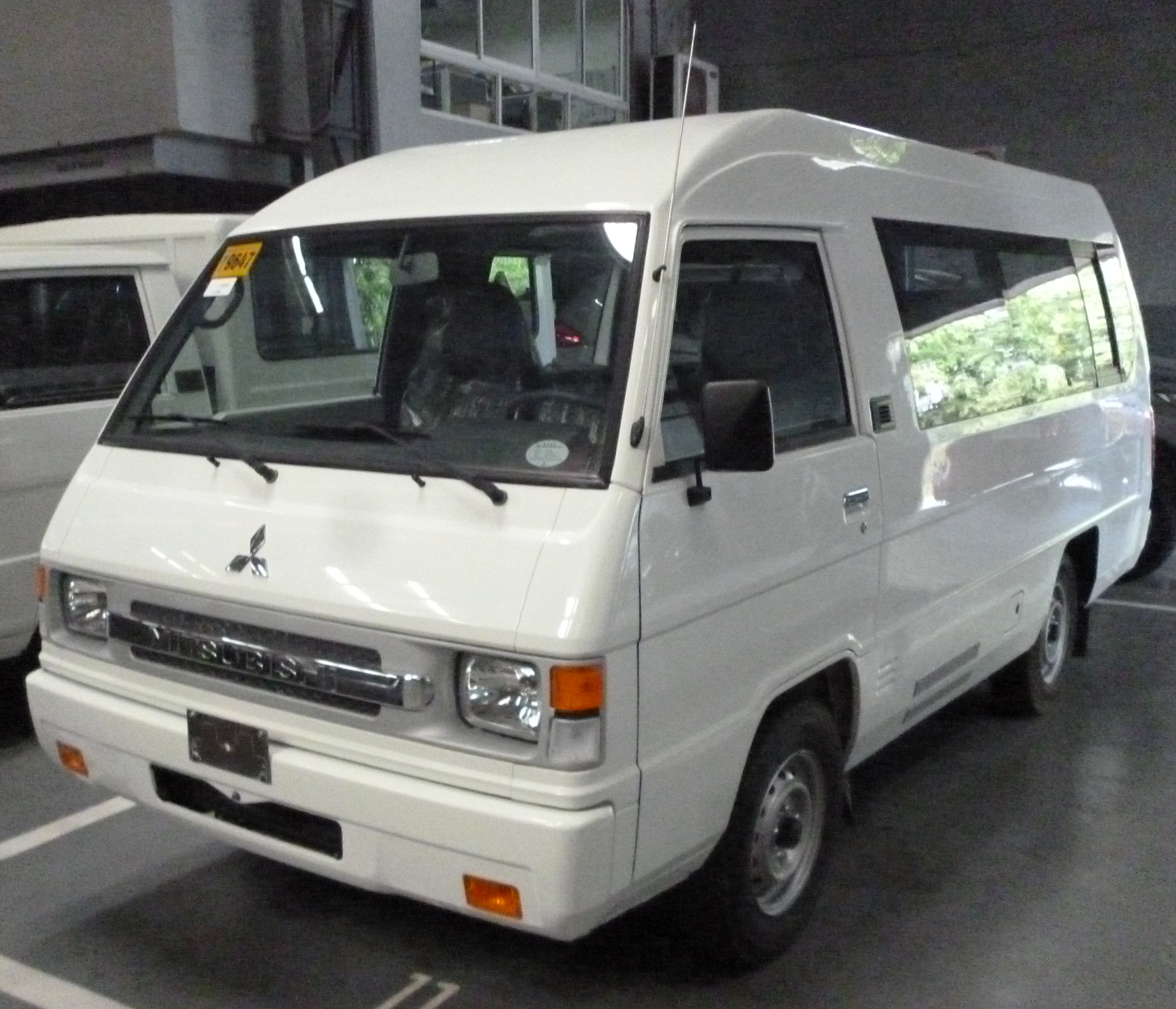
2016 Mitsubishi L300 XV coachbuilt by Centro Manufacturing (first facelift, Philippines)

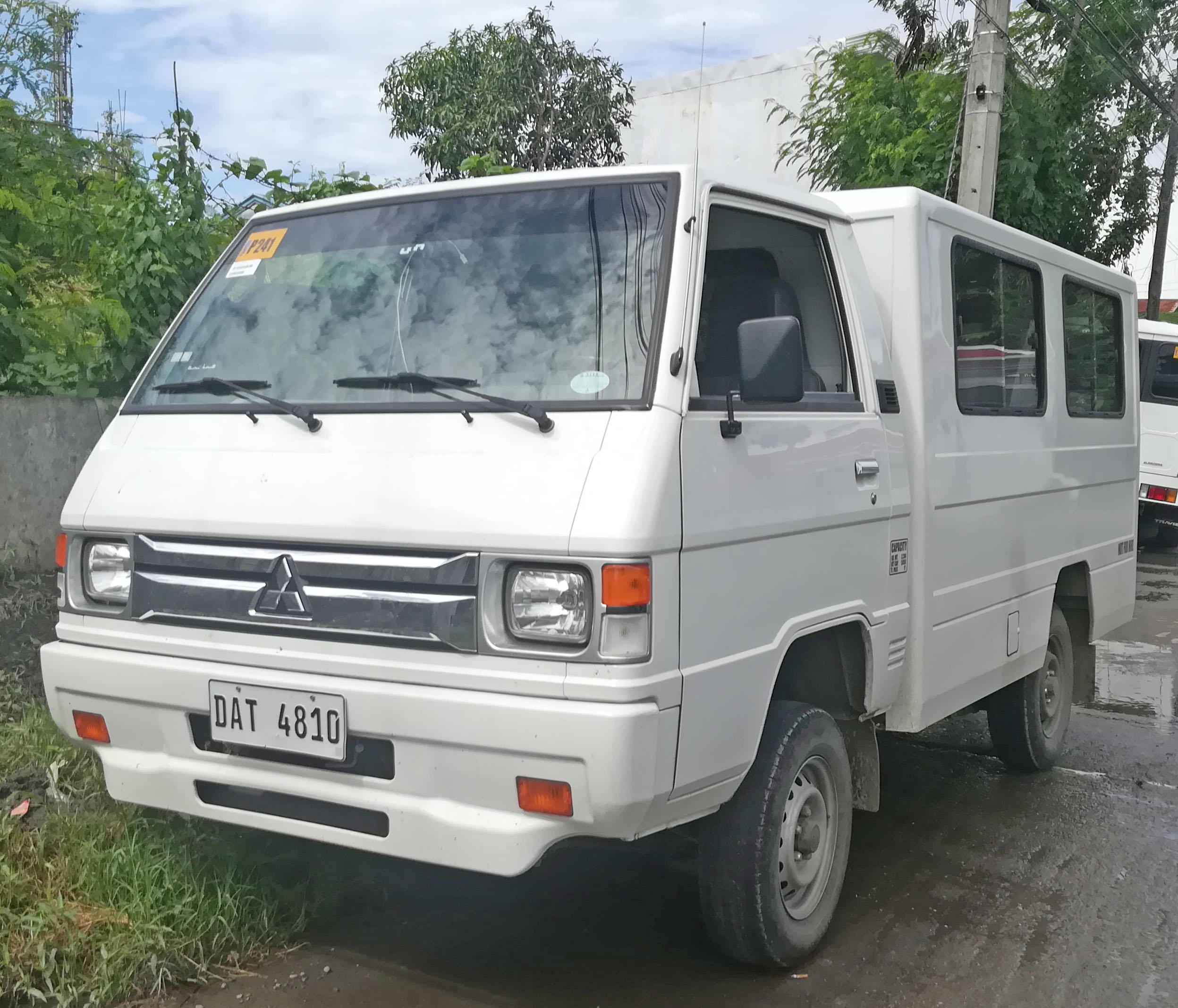
2020 Mitsubishi L300 FB Exceed (second facelift, Philippines). Note the raised cabin to accommodate the new 4N14 engine.

Indonesia

This generation is marketed in Indonesia as the Colt L300. The production started in November 1981 with a 1.4-litre 4G33 petrol engine. Minor facelift occurred in 1984, the round shape headlights were replaced with square unit. The engine was also replaced with a more powerful 1.6-litre 4G32 petrol engine and also a 2.3-litre 4D55 diesel engine option. The second facelift occurred in 1987, it received garnish grille with big "MITSUBISHI" badge. The short lived 2.3-litre diesel engine was replaced in 1988 with the larger 2.5-litre 4D56 unit. Due to lack of demand, the petrol engine was discontinued around October 1995. The third facelift occurred in 2007 with new grille model and power steering.

From 2010 until 2018, Isuzu Indonesia sold this second generation Delica as the Isuzu Bison with an Isuzu Panther-sourced 4JA1L 2.5-litre diesel engine with 80 PS (59 kW). The Bison costs higher than a corresponding L300 due to an agreement between the two countries. The production of the L300 was moved from the former PT Krama Yudha Ratu Motor (KRM) plant in Pulo Gadung, East Jakarta to the new Mitsubishi Motors Cikarang plant in Bekasi, West Java beginning in April 2018. In April 2018, the Isuzu Bison was discontinued due to lack of demand and later replaced by Isuzu's fully developed Traga.

Local production of the Colt L300 has been stopped temporarily since April 2022 due to the implementation of the Euro 4 emission standards. In the meantime, the vehicle is imported from the Philippines as the newer 4N14 engine from the Philippine-spec L300 met the standards and received its fourth facelift on 28 June 2022. In May 2023, the Indonesian-spec L300 resumed its local production in its Bekasi plant.

Previously, the Colt L300 was also offered in minivan model. It was introduced in the mid-1980s, although it was not produced directly by KTB, and was produced by local coachbuilders such as Adi Putra and Karya Logam.

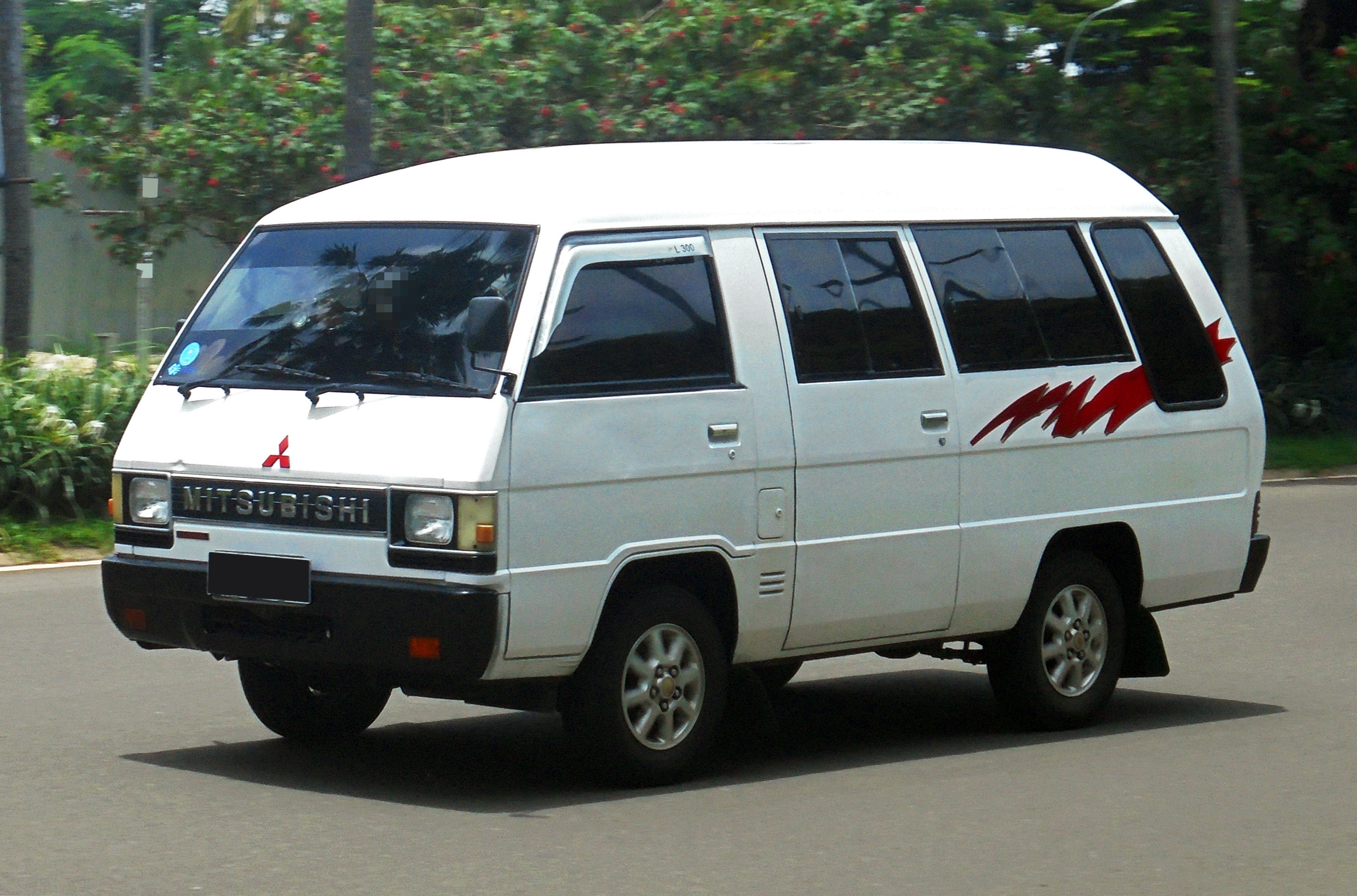
Second facelift Mitsubishi Colt L300 Star Wagon coachbuilt by Karya Logam (Indonesia)

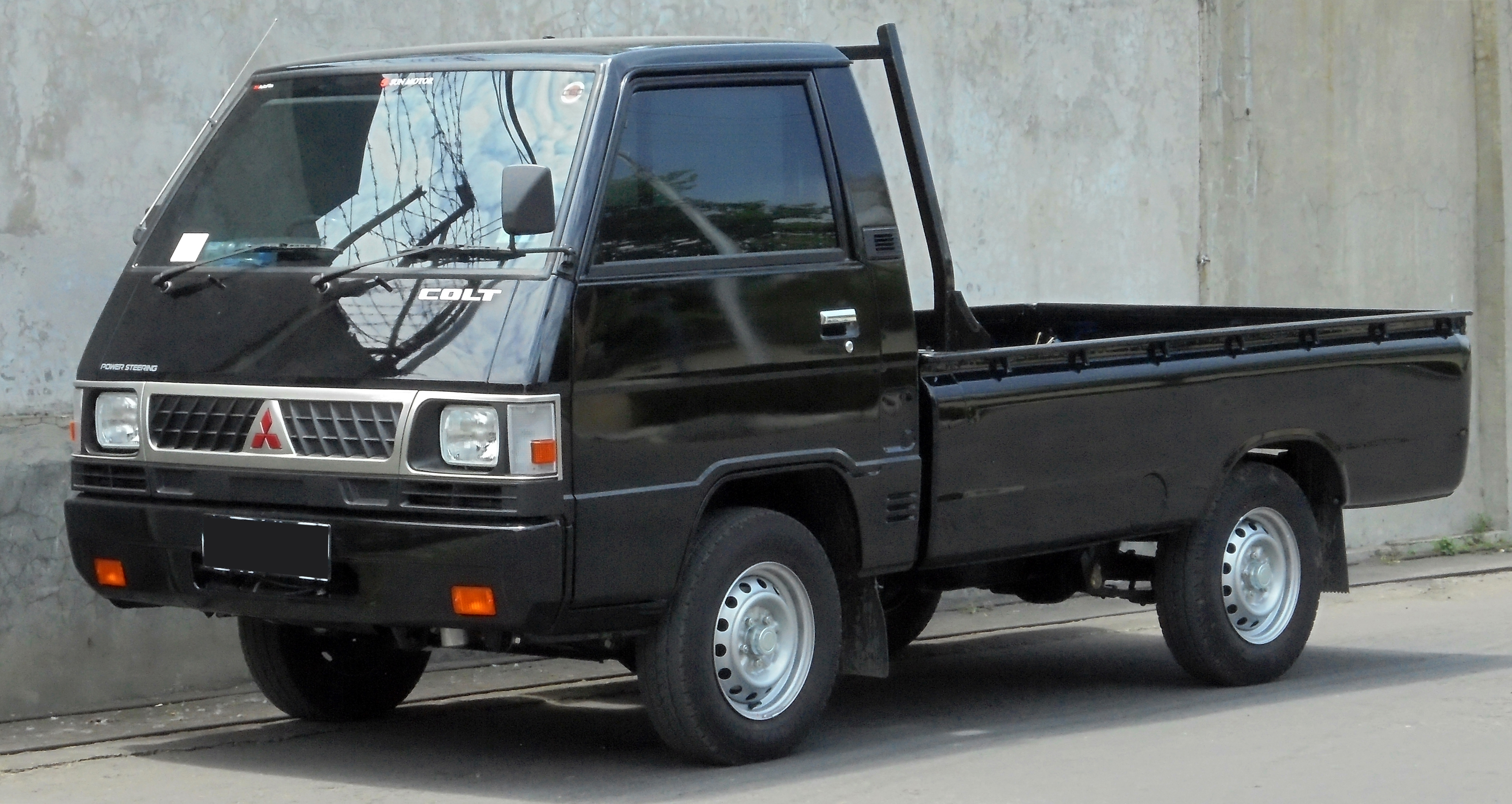
Third facelift Mitsubishi Colt L300 Diesel pickup (Indonesia)

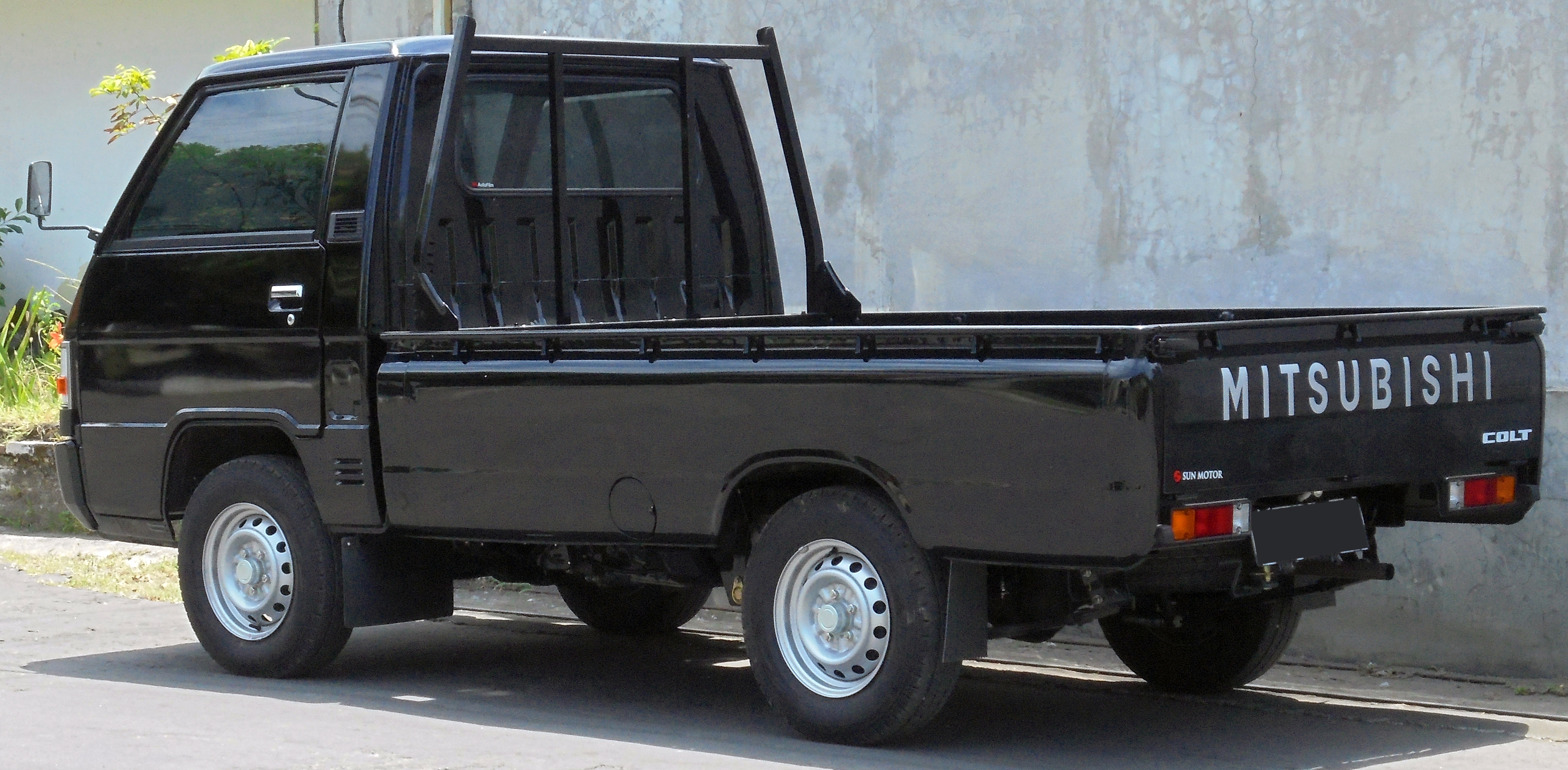
Rear view

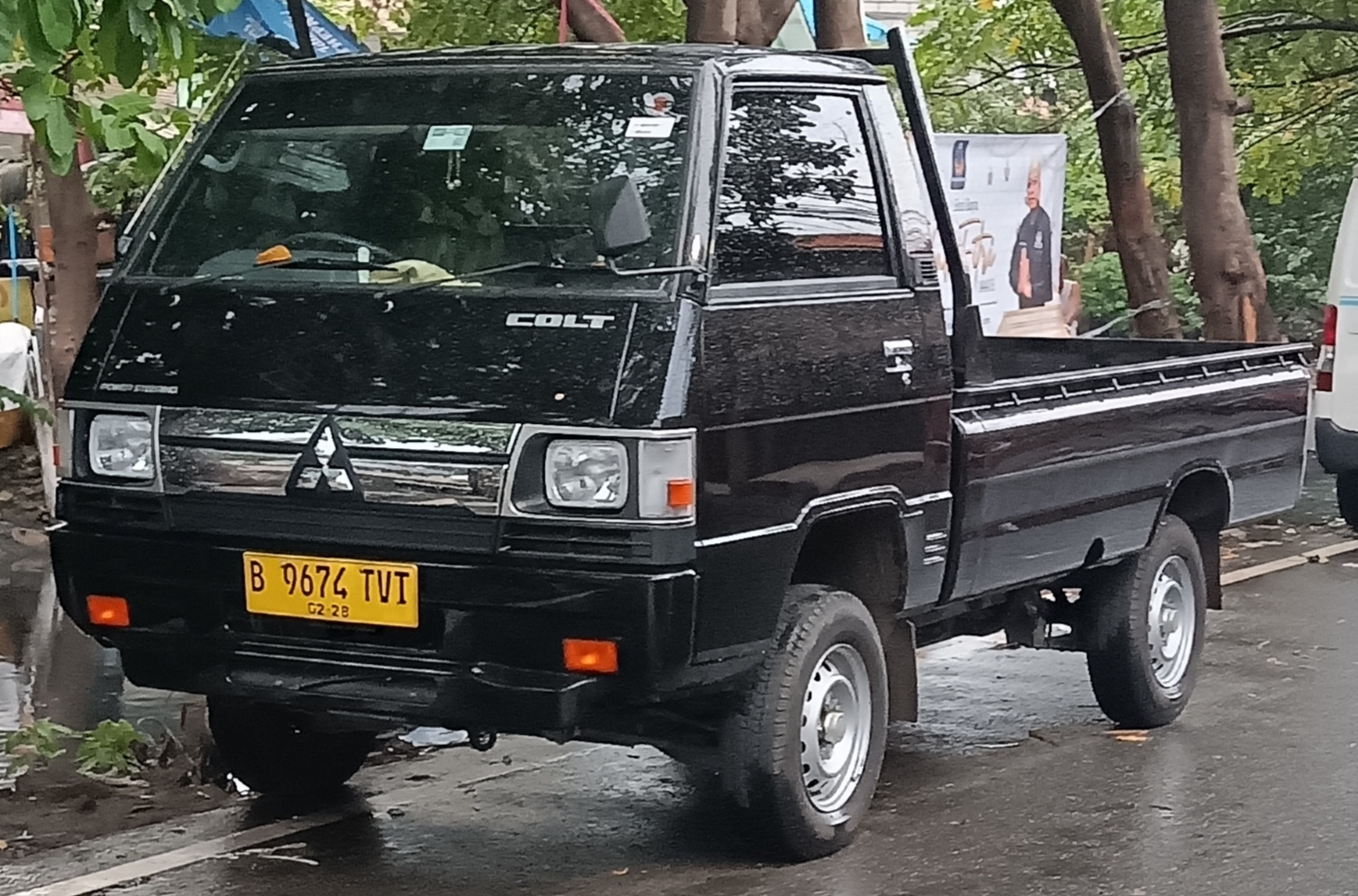
Fourth facelift Mitsubishi Colt L300 (Indonesia)

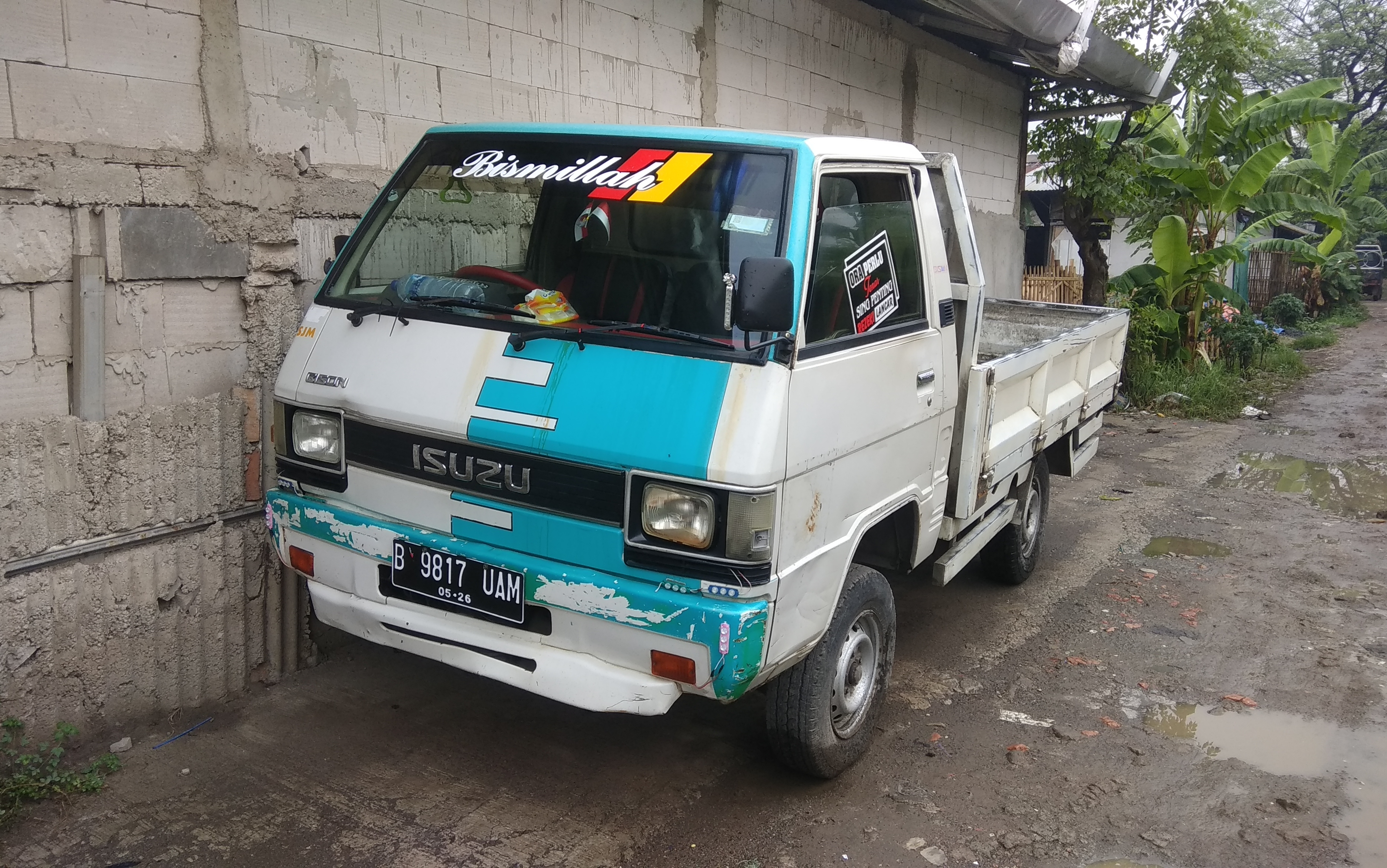
Isuzu Bison (Indonesia)

South Korea

In South Korea, Hyundai built the second generation Delica as the "Hyundai Porter", replacing an earlier model with the same name. South Korean production of this Porter continued alongside the third generation Delica, which was marketed by Hyundai as the "Grace". This Porter was replaced by an indigenously developed third generation Porter in March 1996.

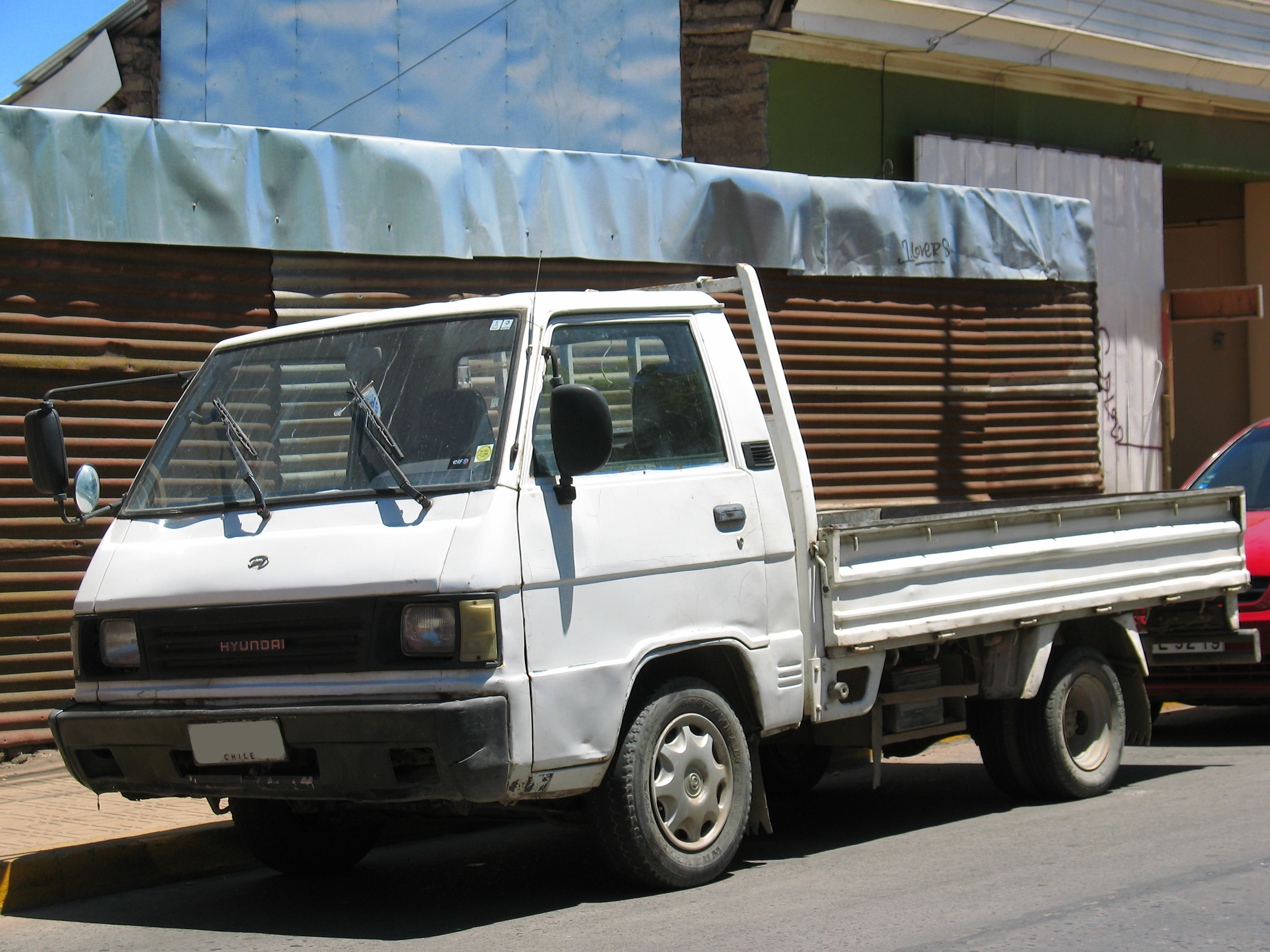
Hyundai Porter (pre-facelift, Chile)

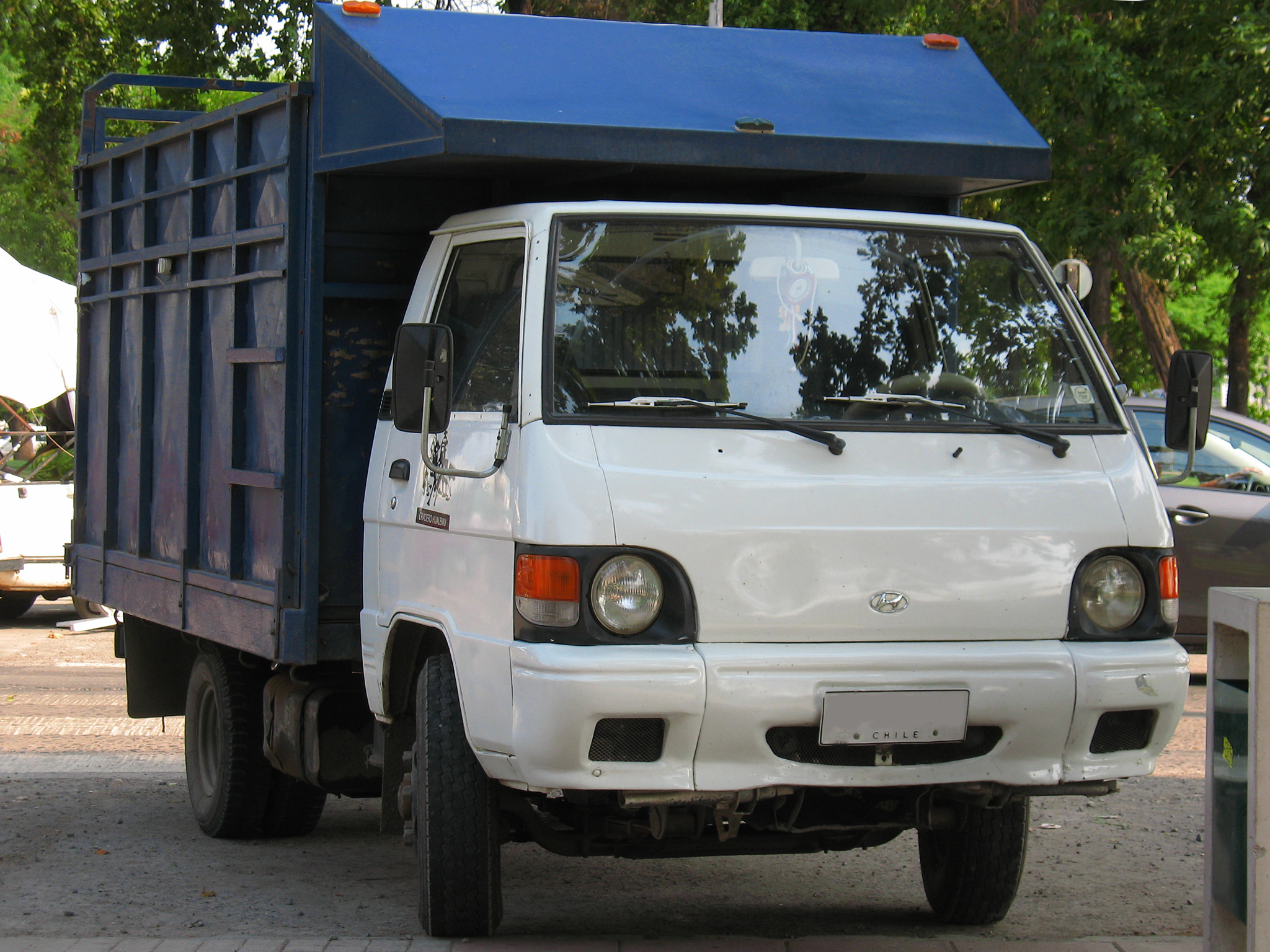
Hyundai H100 Porter (facelift, Chile)

India

From 1997 to 2000, the car was sold by Mahindra & Mahindra in India as the "Mahindra Voyager", but priced too high it was taken out of production after only a little over two years. The Voyager did meet with some success as an ambulance and as a cargo van, but this association only further prevented prospective private purchasers. Unique to the Mahindra Voyager is the fitment of PSA's 2.5-litre XD3P diesel engine, producing 72.5 PS (53 kW) DIN at 4000 rpm.

== Third generation (1986) ==
Third generation
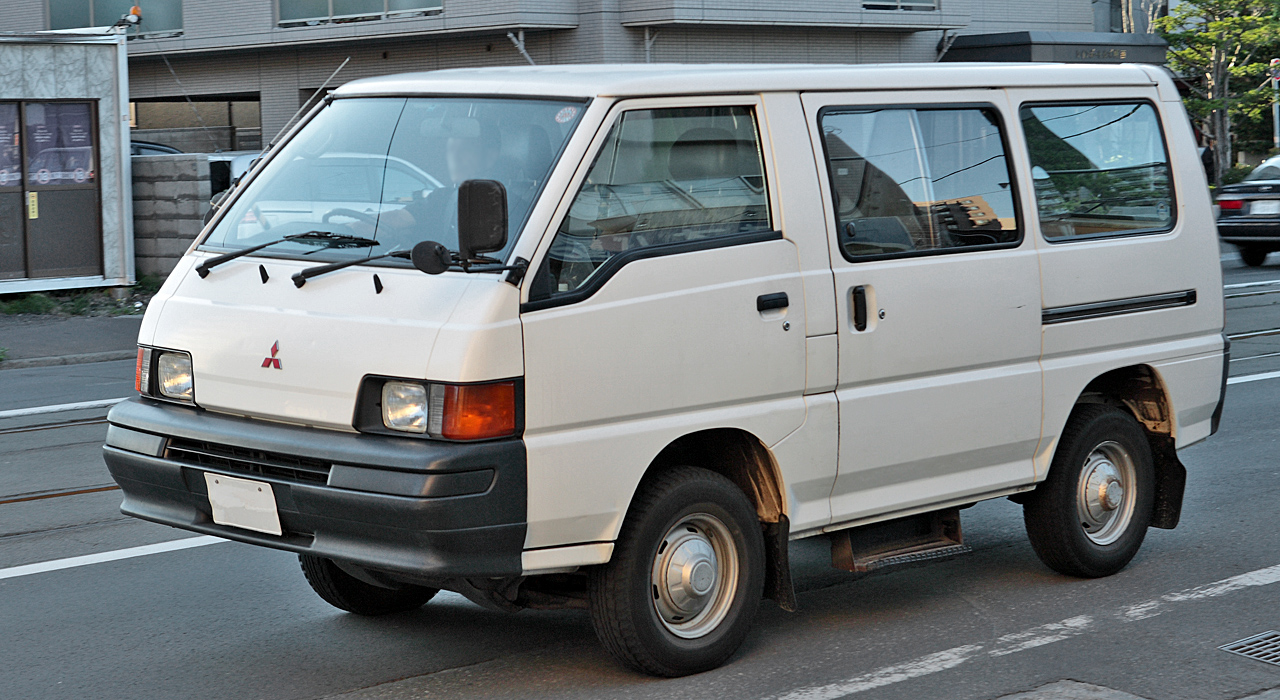
- A Mitsubishi Delica 4x4 van

Overview
- Also called: Mitsubishi L300; Mitsubishi Express (Australia); Mitsubishi Starwagon (Australia); Mitsubishi Versa Van; Mitsubishi Van/Wagon (US); Dodge 1000 (Mexico); Hyundai Grace; Hyundai H-100; Mitsubishi L300 Exceed (Philippines); Soueast Delica (China); Wanli Grace WLZ6470 (China); Sanxing SXZ6441 (China); CMC D260 (Taiwan); CMC D270 (Taiwan)
- Production: 1986–1999; 1999–2013 (extended production); 1986–2004 (Hyundai); 1991–present (CMC); 1997–2004 (Philippines); 1986–1994 (Malaysia); 1996–2013 (Soueast Motors)
- Assembly: Japan: Nagoya (Nagoya Plant); South Korea: Ulsan (Hyundai Ulsan Plant, Grace until 2000); Gwangju (Kia Gwangju Plant, Grace only); Philippines: Cainta (MMPC); Taiwan: Taipei (CMC); Venezuela: Caracas (MMC Automotriz); China: Fuzhou (Soueast Motors)/Zhanjiang (Zhanjiang Sanxing Motors); Malaysia: Pekan, Pahang (AMM)

Body and chassis
- Body style: 2-door pickup 4-door van/minibus
- Layout: Mid engine, rear-/four-wheel drive
- Platform: P01V–P35W

Powertrain
- Engine: Petrol: 1439 cc 4G33 I4; 1597 cc 4G32 I4 (P02/12); 1795 cc 4G62 I4; 1997 cc 4G63 I4; 2351 cc 4G64 I4 (P24); 2378 cc 4G69 I4 (Taiwan); Diesel engine: 2476 cc 4D56 I4; 2476 cc 4D56 TD I4; 2607 cc D4BB I4 (China)
- Transmission: 4-speed automatic 5-speed manual CMC (2019): 5-speed automatic 6-speed manual

Dimensions
- Wheelbase: 2,235–2,435 mm (88.0–95.9 in)
- Length: 4,380–4,780 mm (172.4–188.2 in); 4,945–4,952 mm (194.7–195.0 in) (Soueast Delica)
- Width: 1,690 mm (66.5 in); 1,695 mm (66.7 in) (Soueast Delica)
- Height: 1,840–1,955 mm (72.4–77.0 in); 1,970 mm (77.6 in) (Soueast Delica)

Chronology
- Successor: Hyundai Starex / Hyundai H-1 (South Korea)

In June 1986, the Delica underwent its third full model change. More aerodynamic than previous versions, its monocoque body and extensive safety features proved very popular in Japan's fast-growing recreational vehicle market segment. The more rounded design was referred to as "soft cube" styling by Mitsubishi. Passenger versions continued to be sold as Delica Star Wagon, which became just plain "Starwagon" in Australia. The commercial version is called the "Express" in Australia. Two wheelbases have been offered. In 1990, the Australian market received the naturally aspirated diesel engine as an option; this was the first Delica so equipped in that market.

Although the subsequent L400 Delica and Delica Space Gear were introduced in 1994, production of the Delica vans and wagons continued for the Japanese market until 1998. The lineup was actually expanded, as a truck version was introduced in May 1994, finally replacing the long running second generation truck. The Delica truck was available in a short or a long wheelbase, with the LWB version receiving the twin rectangular headlights as previously used on the Delica Star Wagon. The L300/Delica van versions also remained in production for export markets. These export markets received a facelift in 1999, released in September of that year in Australia. In Japan the commercial Delica range was replaced by a badge-engineered Mazda Bongo under an OEM deal which began in November 1999.

In May 2013, Mitsubishi discontinued the commercial version of the third generation Delica in Australia—badged as the Mitsubishi Express—due to its inferior safety. The Express was the last new car to be sold in Australia with a one-star ANCAP rating. The Express had changed little since it received a minor model change in 2003.

A large range of engines were available, from a 1.4-litre up to a 2.4-litre petrol, and also a 2.5-litre diesel and turbodiesel, plus a 2.6-litre naturally aspirated diesel. Rear- or four-wheel drive, several bodystyles and two different wheelbases made for a particularly extensive line-up. The four-wheel drive chassis was based on that of the contemporary Mitsubishi Pajero, although parts are seldom interchangeable. Late general export market versions received a carburetted 16-valve version of the 2.0-litre 4G63 four-cylinder, with 116 hp (87 kW) at 6,000 rpm.

=== Markets ===
==== Asia ====
Cargo versions are built by the China Motor Corporation in Taiwan. This generation Delica was also built under license by Hyundai of South Korea, where it was called the "Hyundai Grace" or "Hyundai H-100" in some Eurasian markets. Launched in December 1986, this version originally received the twin headlights as used in the US market versions, but after a front-end facelift the new more aerodynamic version received thinner and more rounded headlights. This version was called the "New Grace". Both the 2.4-litre petrol and 2.5-litre turbo-diesel inline-four engines were available, both Mitsubishi designs. Hyundai terminology resulted in the 4D56 diesel engine being renamed D4BX / D4BA. It takes two more minor changes at each 1996 and 2002, production ended in end of 2003. In 1996, the Delica was also rebadged under the Soueast brand, which occurred through 2013. In the Philippines, this generation of the Delica was called the "L300 Exceed" to differentiate itself to the ageing second generation L300 Versa Van which was still being sold there at that time, and was introduced starting from 1997. Although prior to that, Hyundai has already been selling its pre-facelift rebadged sibling, the Hyundai Grace since the start of the 1990s. The Mitsubishi Delica was launched in Malaysia in 1986 via distributor USF, offering both standard van and rare four-wheel-drive (4WD) rugged configurations.

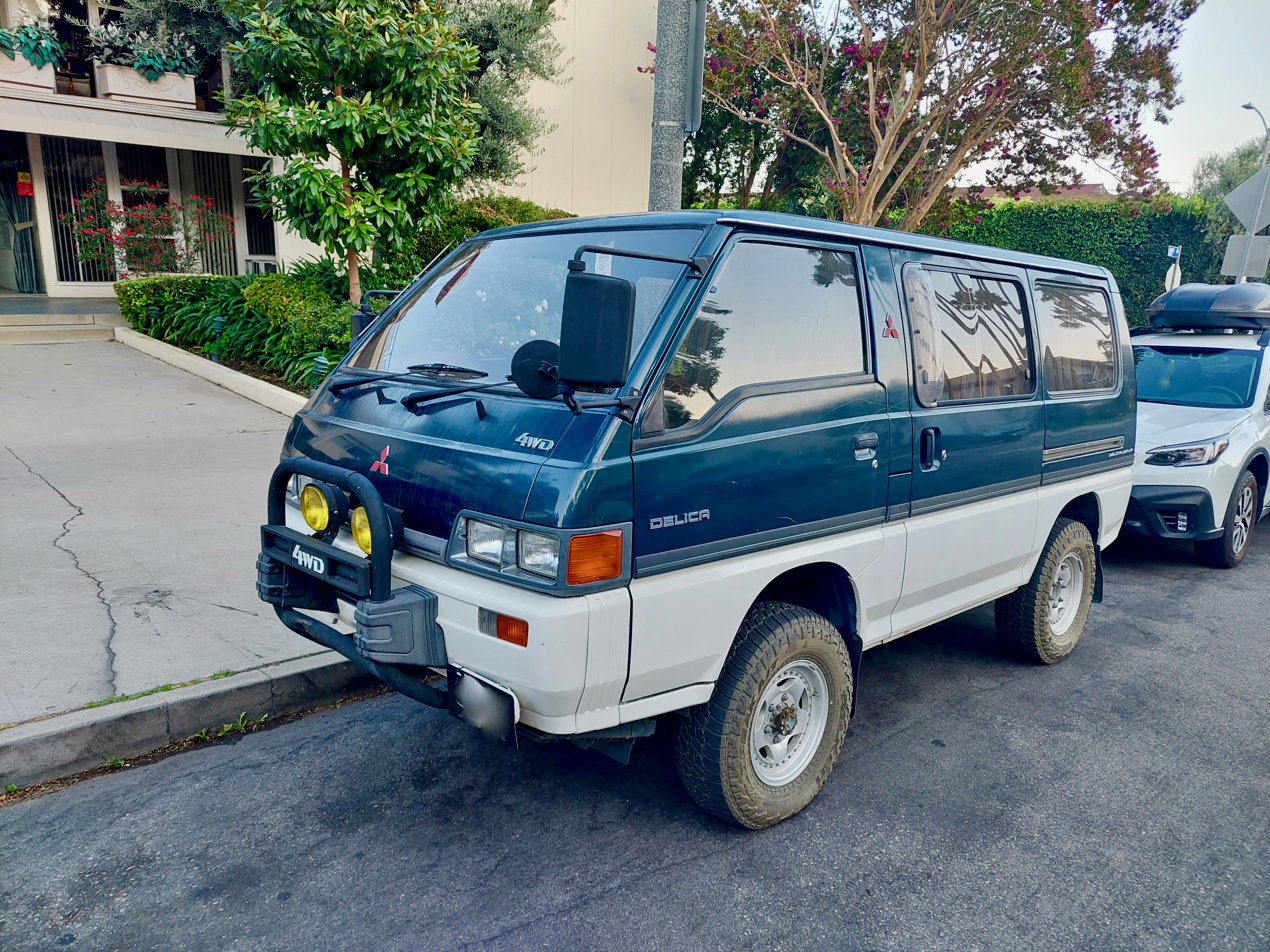
1990 Mitsubishi Delica Star Wagon 4WD (Japan, pre-facelift)

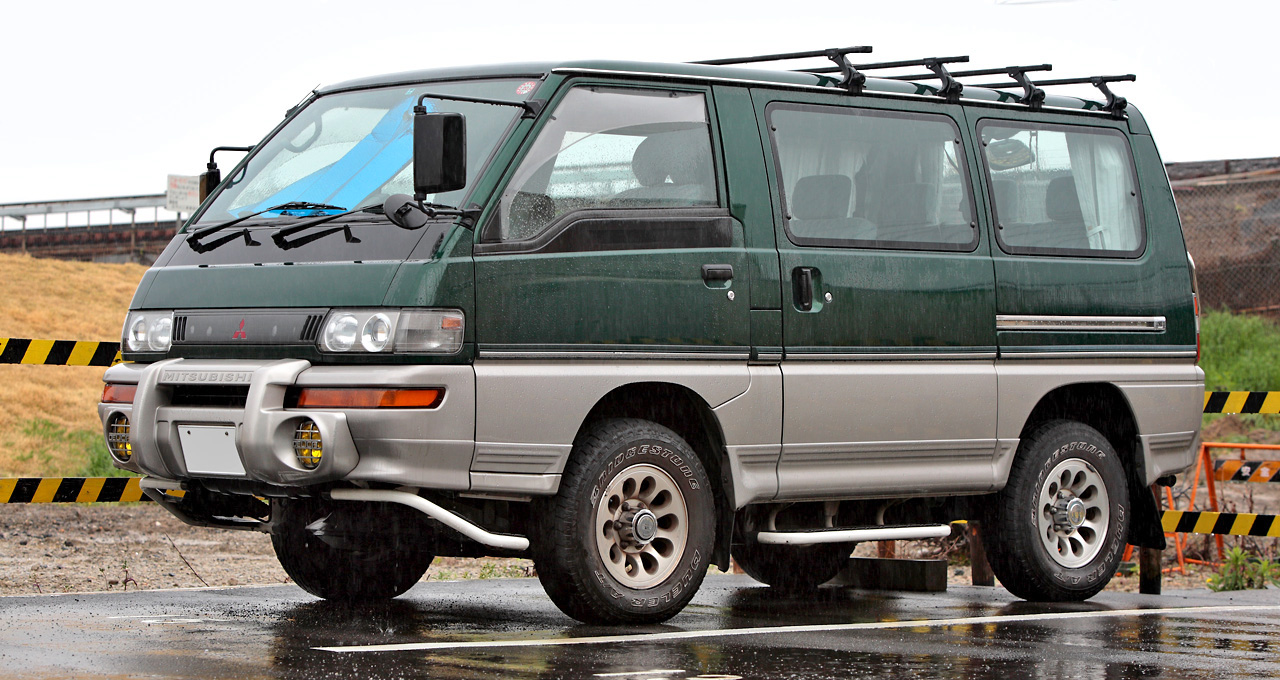
Mitsubishi Delica Star Wagon (Japan, facelift)

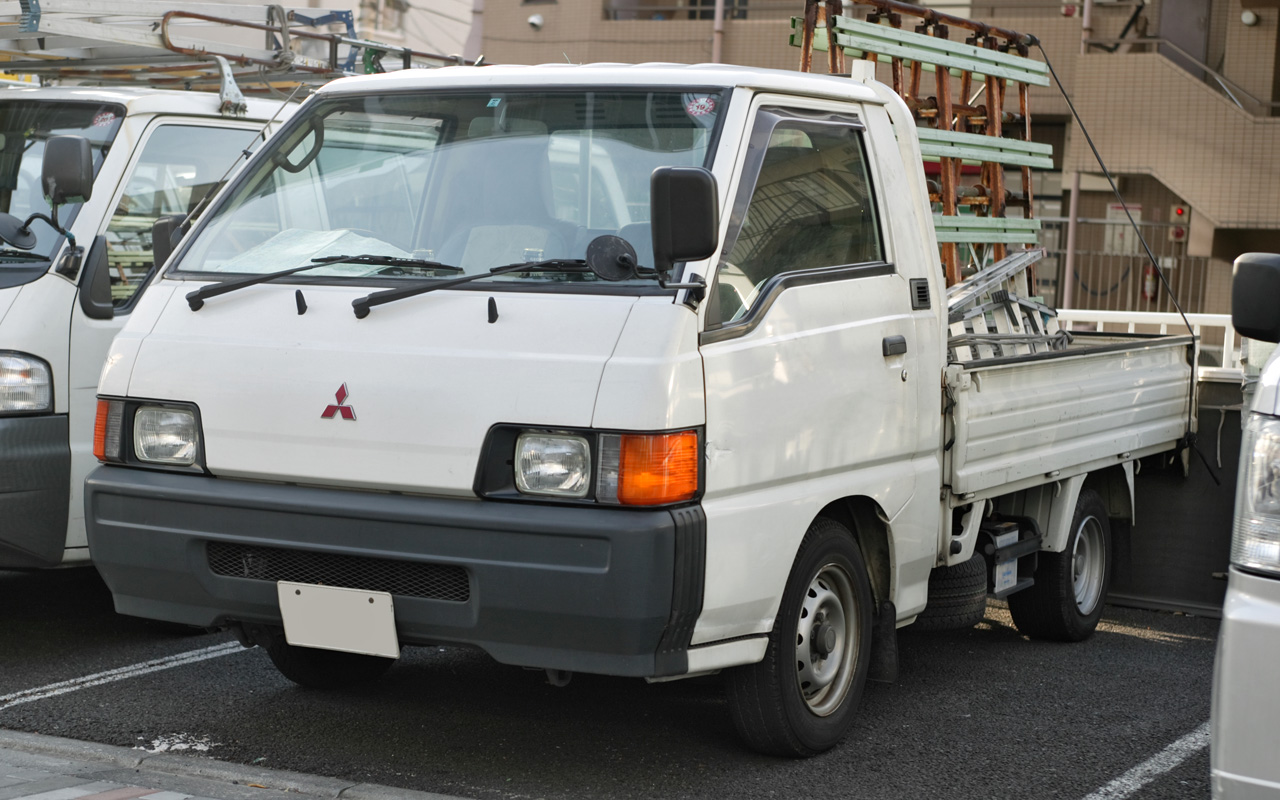
Pre-facelift Mitsubishi Delica pickup (Japan)

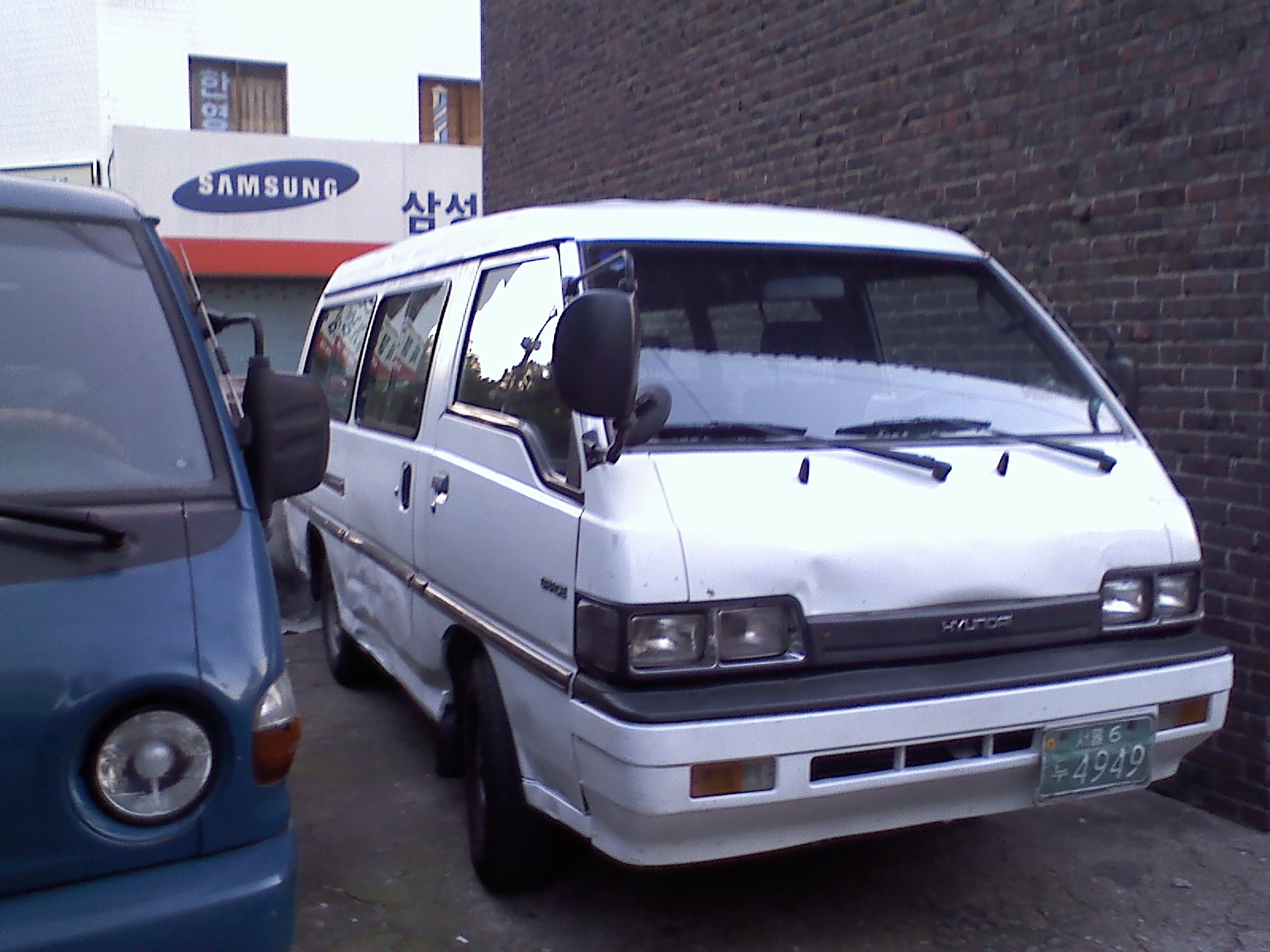
Pre-facelift Hyundai Grace (South Korea)

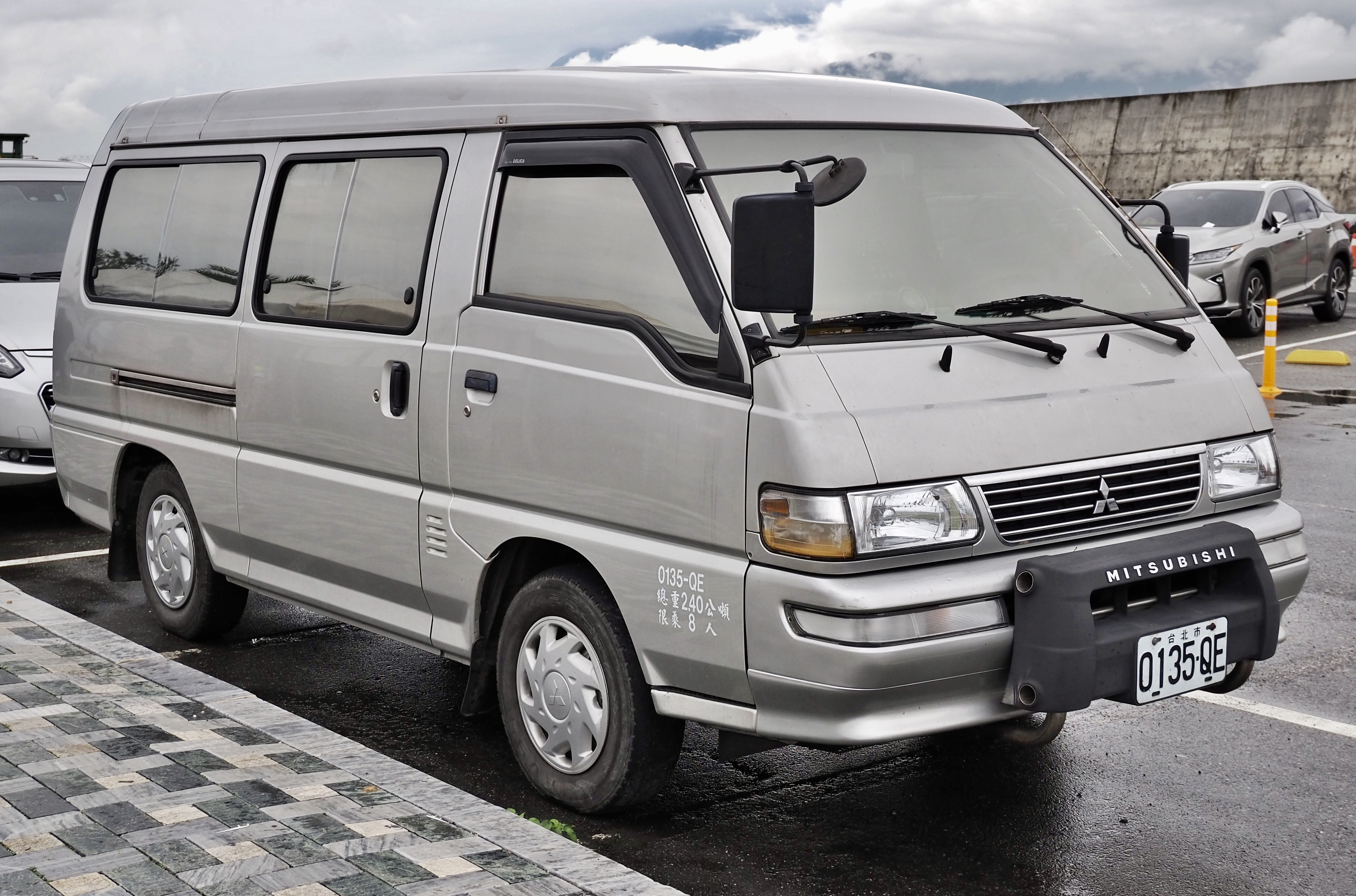
2007 Mitsubishi Delica van by CMC (Taiwan)

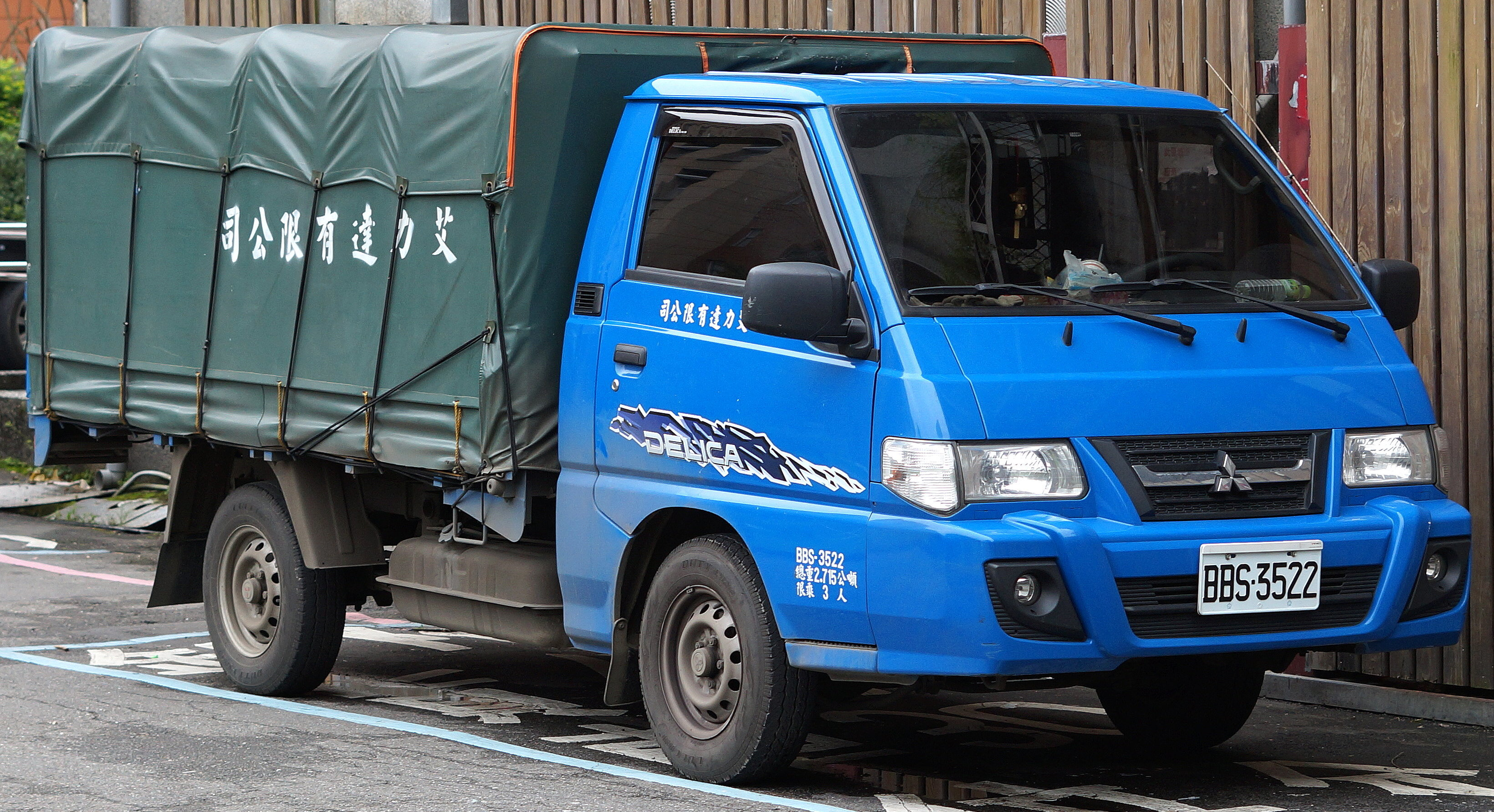
2013 Mitsubishi Delica truck by CMC (Taiwan)

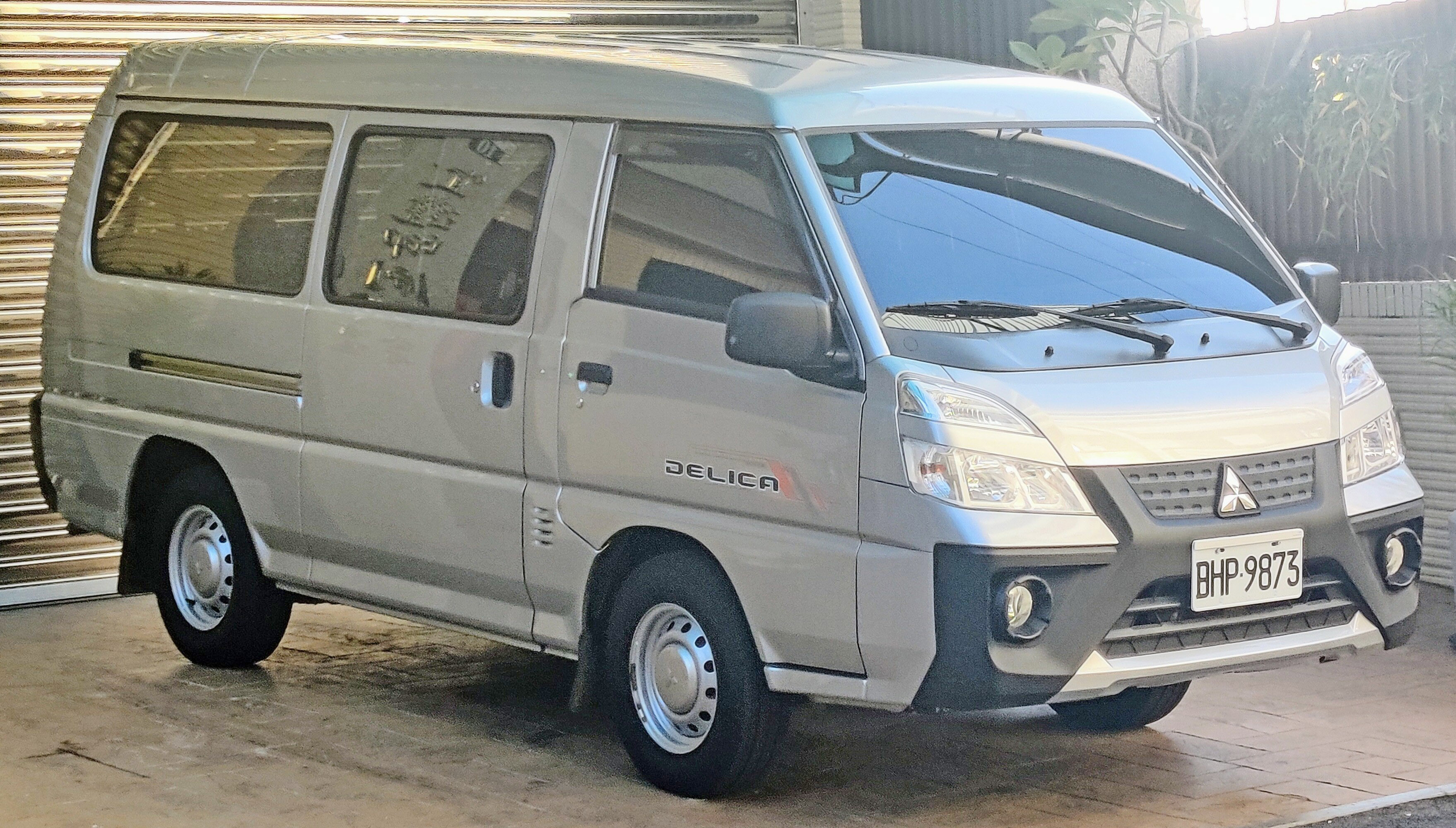
2019 Mitsubishi Delica van by CMC (Taiwan)

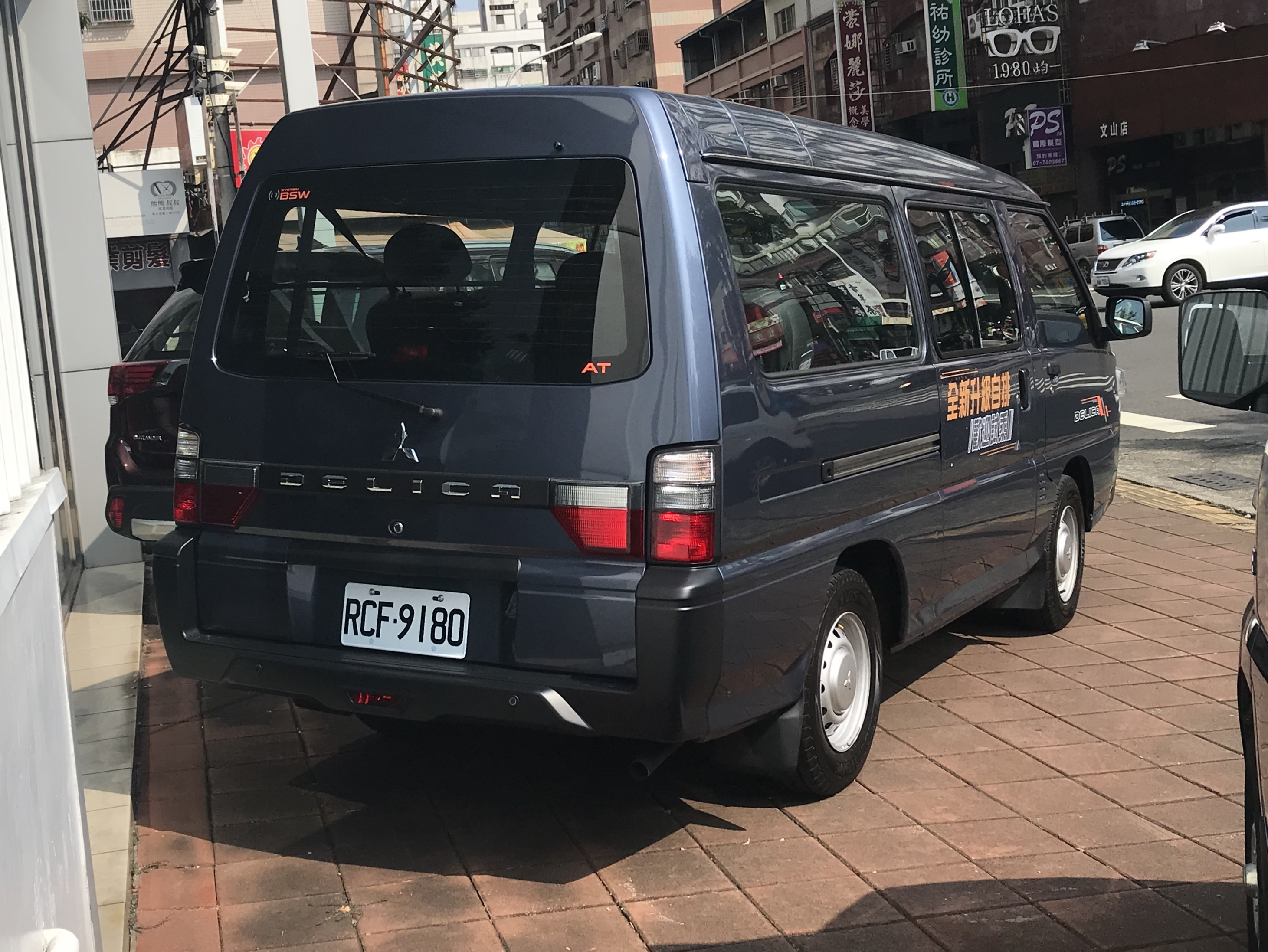
2019 Mitsubishi Delica van by CMC (Taiwan)

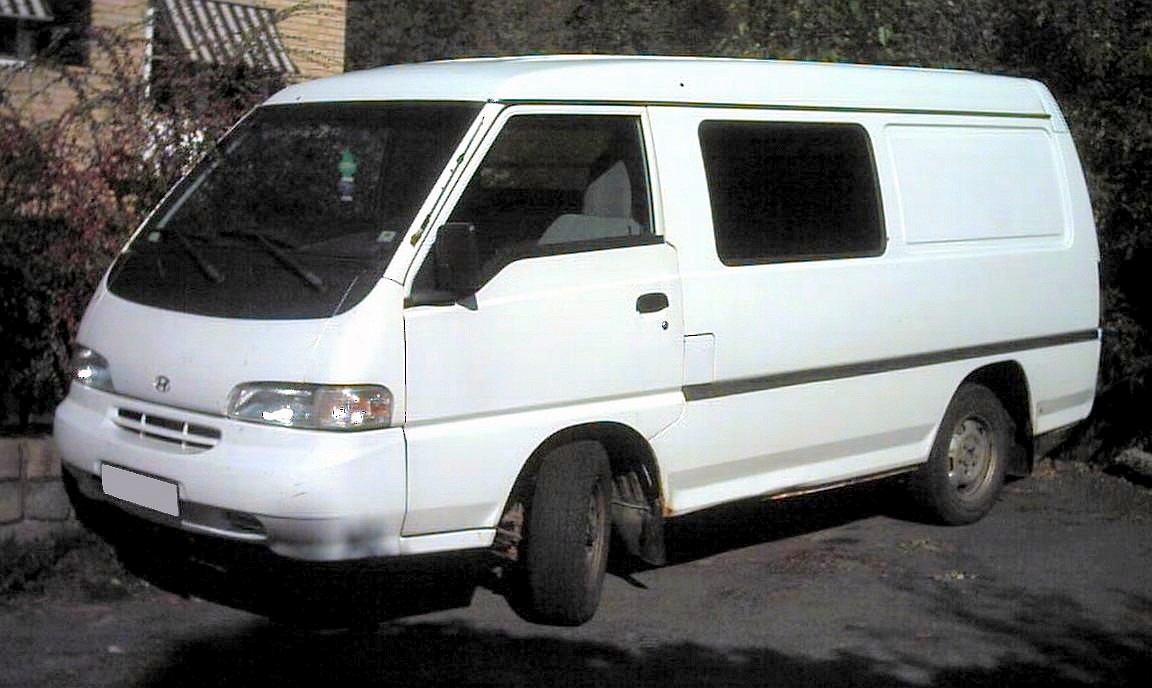
Hyundai Grace

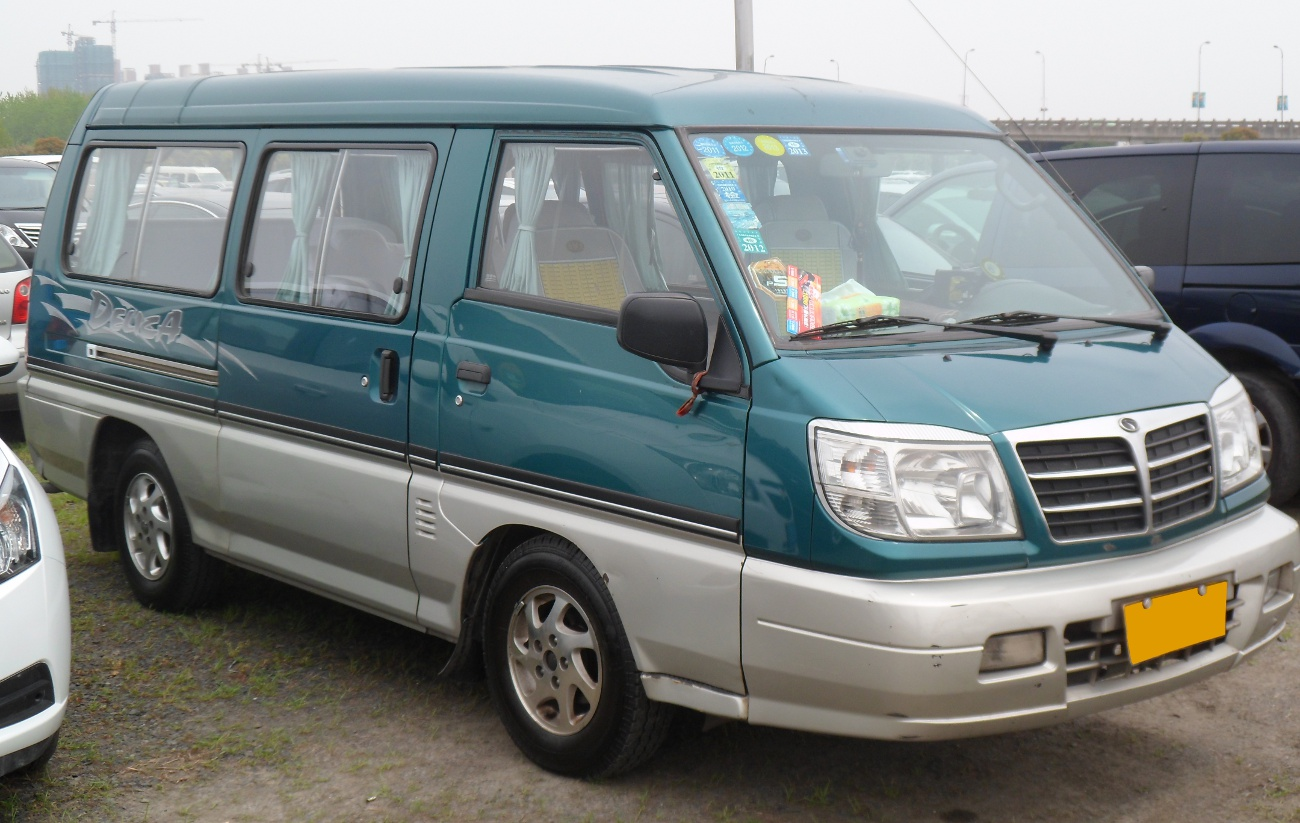
Soueast Delica first facelift (China)

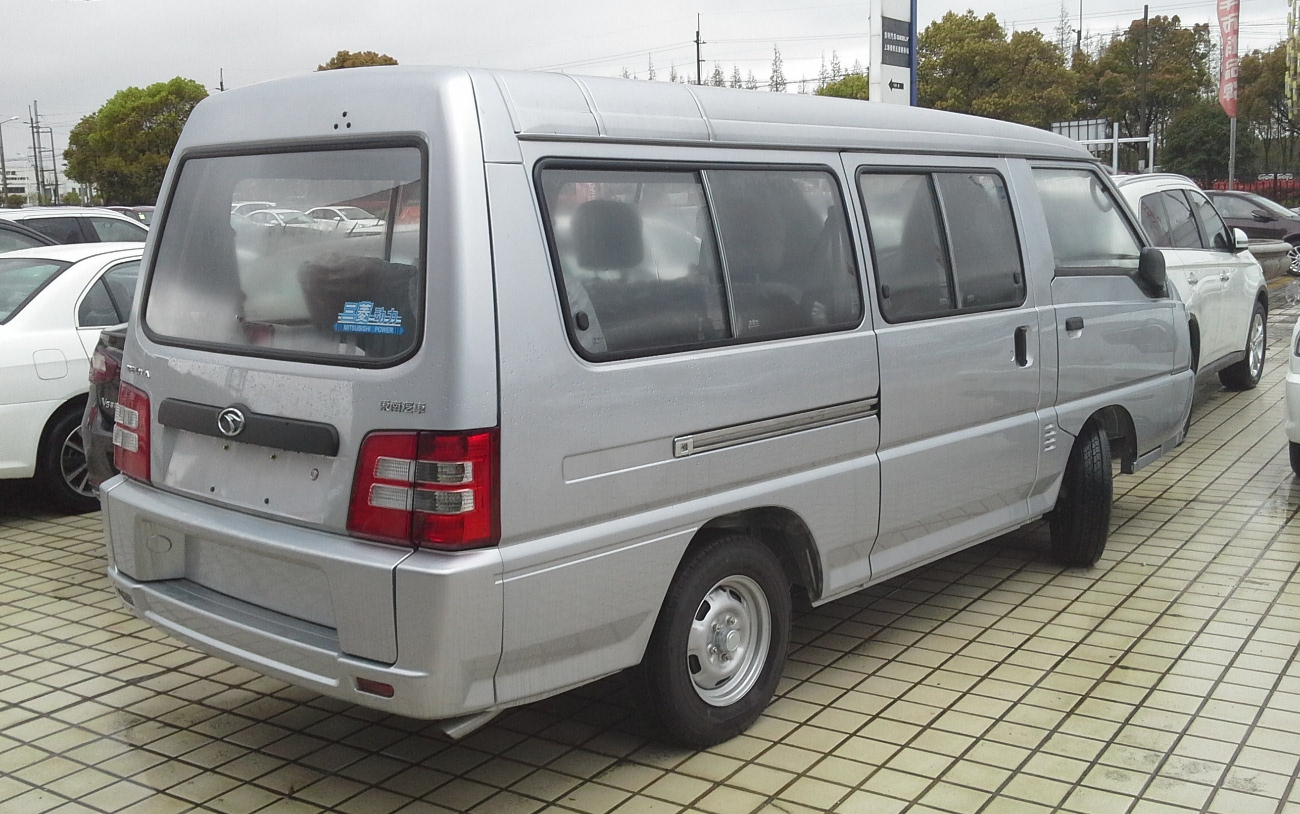
Soueast Delica first facelift (China)

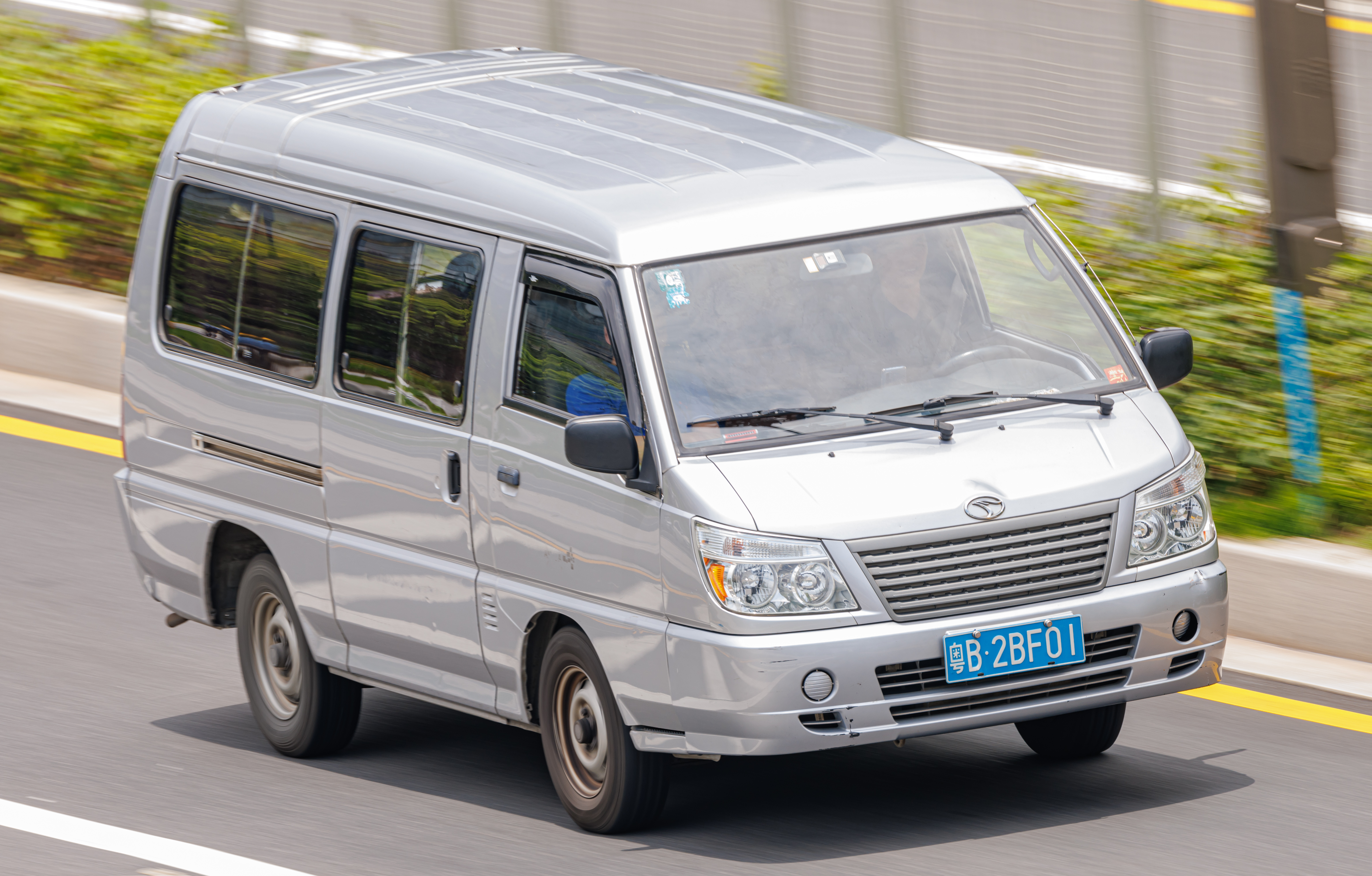
Soueast Delica second facelift (China)

==== North America ====
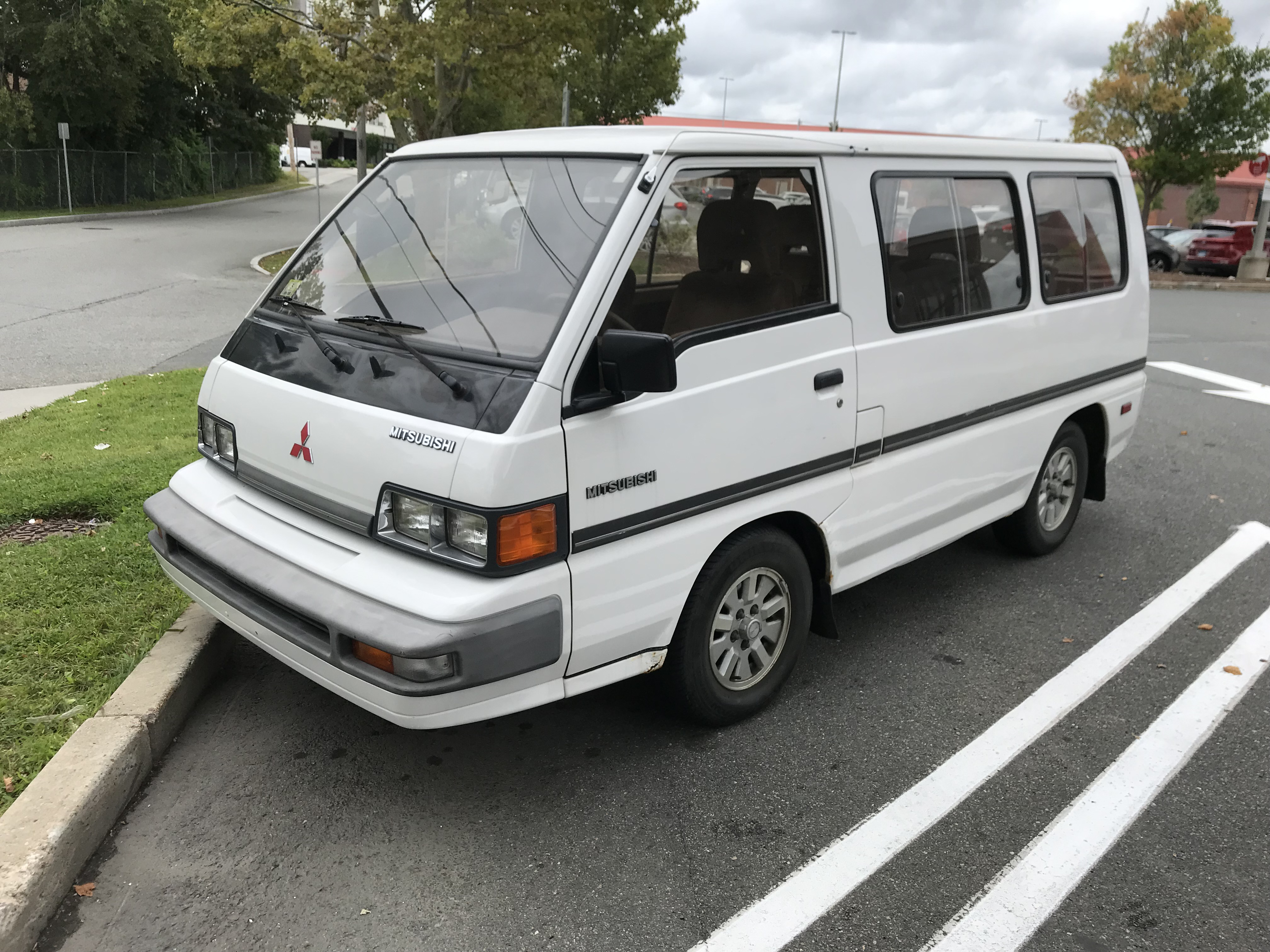
Mitsubishi Wagon (factory US model)

From 1987 until 1990, Mitsubishi sold this model in small numbers in the United States as the "Wagon" for passenger versions and "Van" for windowless cargo versions. The US versions all received a 107 horsepower (80 kW) version of the 2.4-litre 4G64 engine. For model years 1990 and 1991, an LS version of the Wagon was added. Taiwanese-produced CMC Delica vans are sold in Mexico as the Dodge 1000 as of July 2007. The Mitsubishi Expo LRV replaced the Van/Wagon in 1992.

Once the fifteen-year minimum age threshold was reached, enthusiasts began importing Japanese domestic market Delicas to Canada. The 4WD turbo diesel van is also a common choice for Canadian postal workers who require a right-hand drive vehicle. The United States has a 25-year threshold for importing cars, and recently Japanese domestic market Delicas have begun to gain a following there as well.

Starting in 2007, the Cargo versions built by the China Motor Corporation in Taiwan were being exported to Mexico wearing the Dodge 1000 nameplate. This model was discontinued in 2010.

From 2021, the Maine Bureau of Motor Vehicles (BMV) began actively de-registering Delicas imported into the United States that were previously registered in Maine under the 25-year federal import rule, by classifying it as an off-road all-terrain vehicle.

==== Europe ====
Introduced for 1987, the British market received the L300 with either the 1.6- petrol or 2.5-litre diesel engine. Both wheelbases were available. In continental Europe the car was also sold as the L300, with engine options depending on local taxation and market conditions.

=== Safety ===
ANCAP test results* Mitsubishi Express / L300 short wheelbase van (2001)
Test	Score
Overall	1 /5 stars
Frontal offset	1.34/16
Side impact	16/16
Pole	Not Assessed
Seat belt reminders	0/3
Whiplash protection	Not Assessed
Pedestrian protection	Poor
Electronic stability control	Not Available

== Fourth generation (1994) ==
Fourth generation
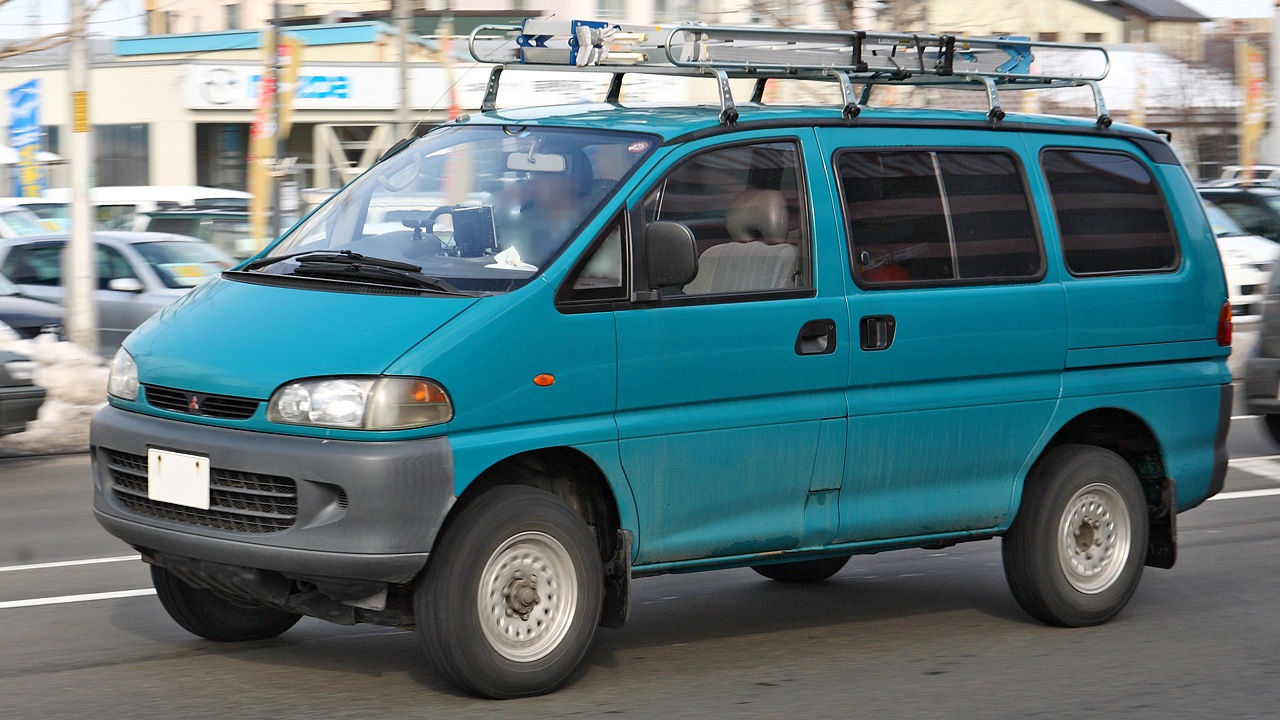
- Mitsubishi Delica Cargo (commercial van)

Overview
- Also called: Mitsubishi L400; Mitsubishi Space Gear; Mitsubishi Express (Australia); Mitsubishi Starwagon (Australia); Dongfeng Fengxing Lingzhi
- Production: 1994–2007; 1994–2006 (Malaysia); 2001–present (China)
- Assembly: Japan: Nagoya; Taiwan (CMC); China: Guangzhou (Baolong); FAW Freewind (Ziyoufeng); Liuzhou (Dongfeng Liuzhou Motor)

Body and chassis
- Body style: 4/5-door minivan
- Layout: Front-engine, rear-wheel-drive Front-engine, four-wheel-drive
- Related: Hyundai Starex (A1); Dongfeng Fengxing Lingzhi; Baolong Pegasus

Powertrain
- Engine: Petrol: 2.0 L 4G63 I4; 2.4 L 4G64 I4; 3.0 L 6G72 V6; Diesel: 2.5 L 4D56 TD I4; 2.8 L 4M40 TD I4
- Transmission: 3-speed automatic with overdrive 5-speed manual

Dimensions
- Wheelbase: 2,800–3,000 mm (110.2–118.1 in)
- Length: 4,595–5,085 mm (180.9–200.2 in)
- Width: 1,695 mm (66.7 in)
- Height: 1,855–2,070 mm (73.0–81.5 in)
- Curb weight: 1,690–2,170 kg (3,730–4,780 lb)

=== 1994–1997 ===
Released on 12 May 1994, the new Delica received considerably more aerodynamic bodywork. No truck model was available of this generation, and passenger models were now called Delica Space Gear in the Japanese domestic market. Body specifications of the Space Gear in Japan ranged from XR, XG, Exceed, Super Exceed and Royal Exceed, and both long and short-wheelbase versions were available.

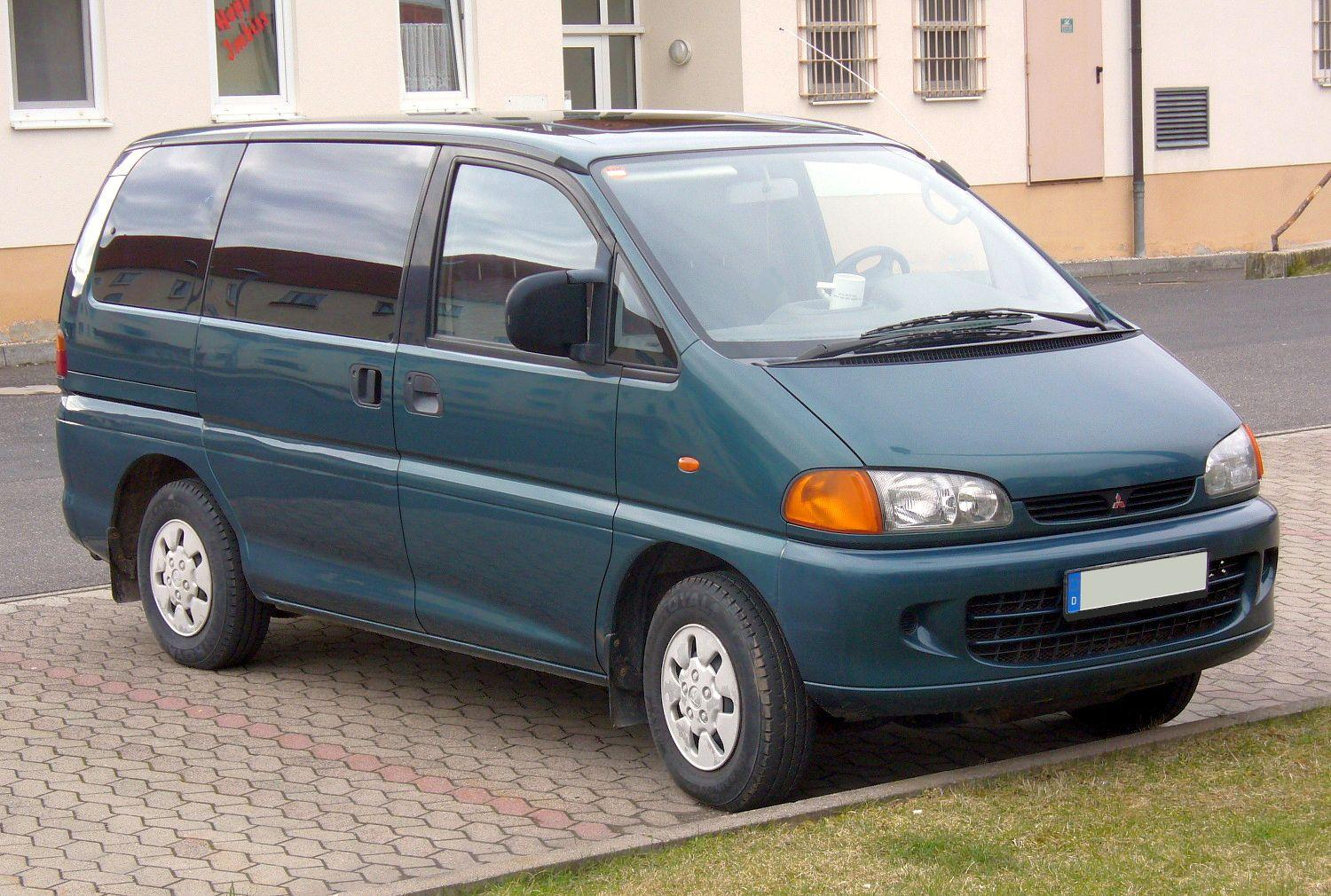

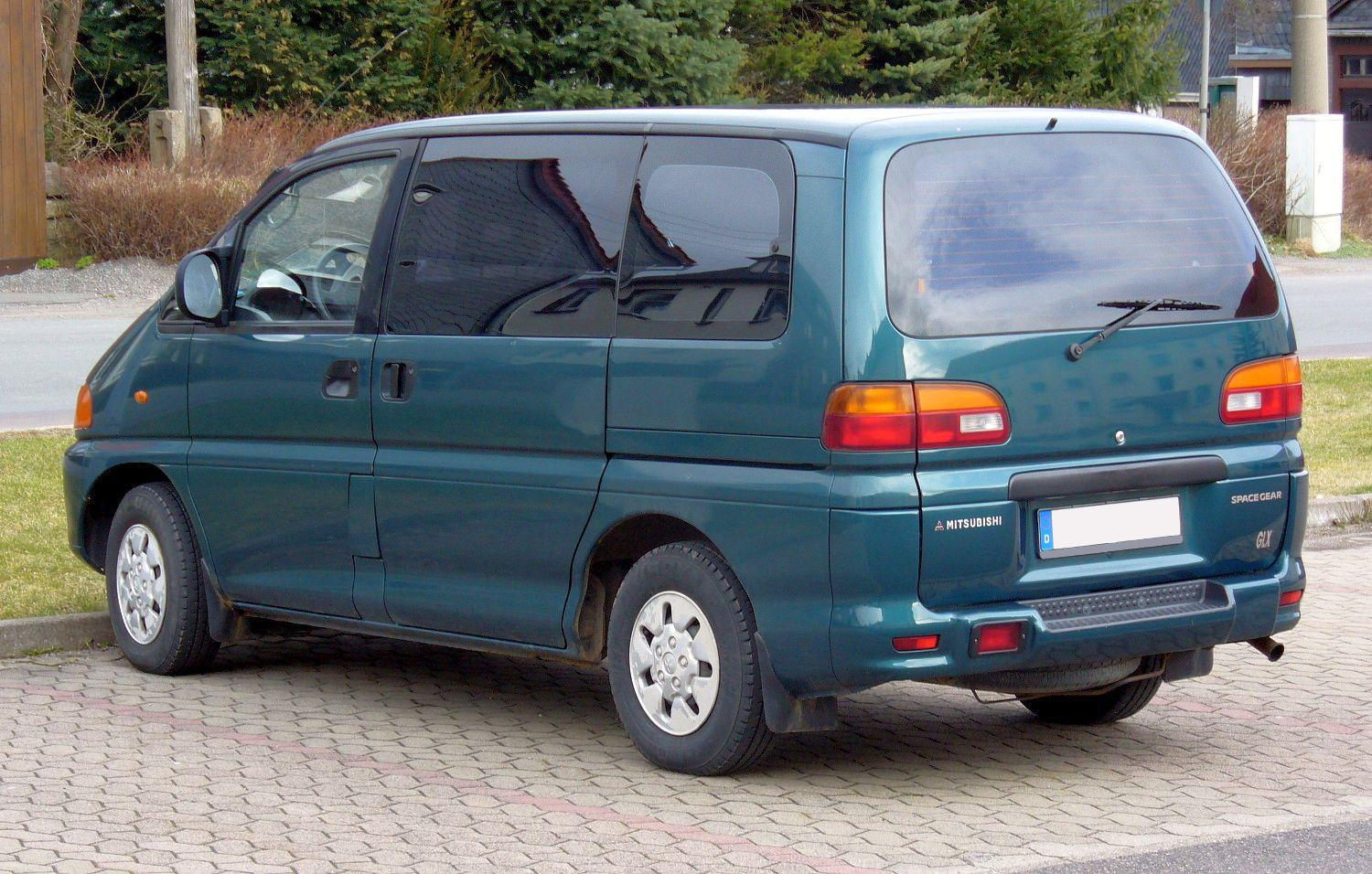
Mitsubishi Space Gear GLX (pre-facelift, Germany)

The fourth generation Delica shares its engine and transmission with the Mitsubishi Pajero, but unlike the Pajero of its time, it is of monocoque construction and lacks a separate chassis. The Delica 4WD still offers ample off-road capabilities, with four-wheel drive, high and low ratio gears and differential locking. It has engine variations from 2.5-litre through to a 2.8-litre intercooled turbo-diesel. 2.4-litre and 3.0-litre V6 petrol engines with 12 or 24 valves are also offered. Apart from the 2.8-litre diesel model all are available as two- or four-wheel drive version.

In many export markets, the cargo versions of the fourth generation were called the Mitsubishi L400 while the passenger versions were called Mitsubishi Space Gear – without using the Delica nameplate at all.

In South Korea, Hyundai used the Mitsubishi Delica as the base vehicle for the Hyundai Starex (A1) manufactured between 1997 and 2007.

In Australia, this generation, known as the WA series was available in both cargo (Mitsubishi Express) and passenger (Mitsubishi Starwagon) versions. The Starwagon was available between September 1994 and 2003. The Express launched at the same time, but continued on until 2005. To differentiate the semi-bonneted WA Express from the cheaper, previous generation SJ series that sold alongside it, the WA models were disambiguated with the "Walk-Thru" designation.

The Australian Starwagons were made available in four levels of specification: GL, GLX, GLS and 4WD. Mitsubishi fitted the GL with a 2.0-litre carburetored inline-four, with the GLX gaining a fuel-injected 2.4-litre inline-four, and the GLS a 3.0-litre V6. Both four-cylinder engines were fitted standard with a five-speed manual transmission with optional four-speed column-shift automatic. The 3.0-litre GLS offered a four-speed floor-mounted automatic as its sole transmission option. The facelift model, released in 1996 saw the range rationalised with only the base GL and mid-range GLX models retained.

=== 1997–2007 ===
In 1997, the Delica was upgraded with a facelift model. The upgrade is mostly cosmetic with changes to the lighting clusters and front body panel, with the integration of a moulded bumper in place of the original three section bullbar. The engine was upgraded with an electronic control type distribution type jet pump and an electronic sidestep was made standard on the higher specification versions.

A final facelift was released in Japan in August 2002.

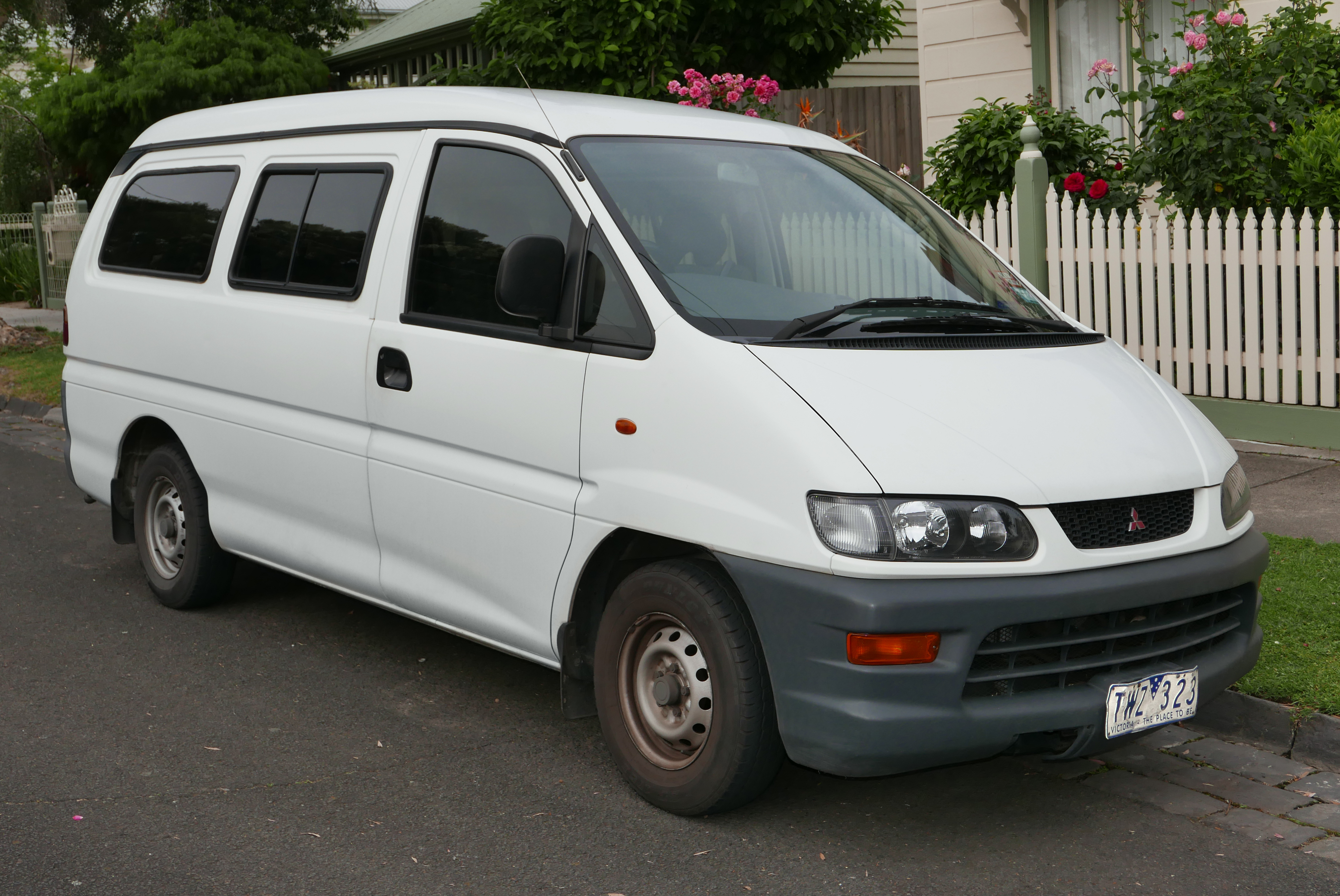
2005 Mitsubishi Express (Australia)

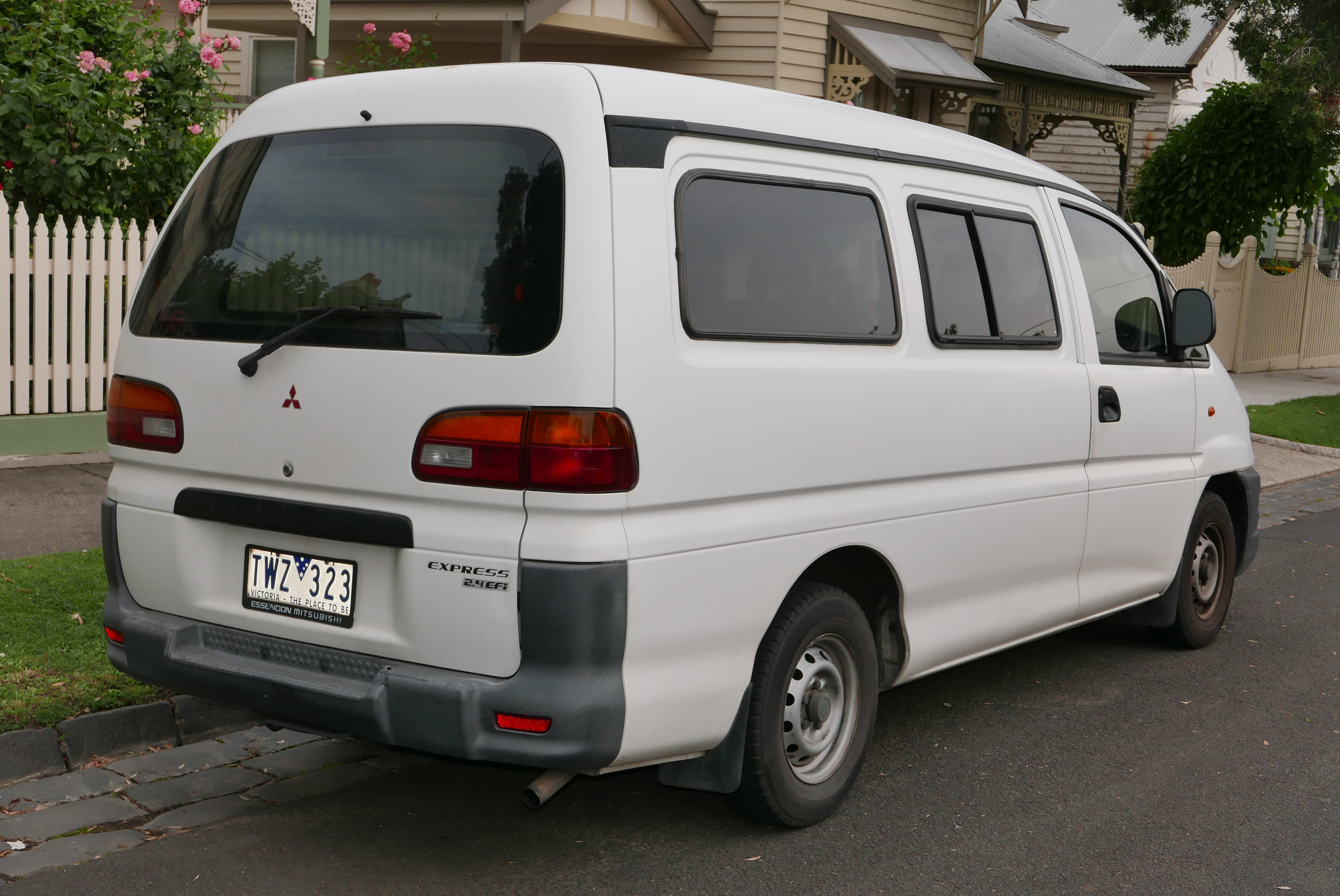
2005 Mitsubishi Express (Australia)

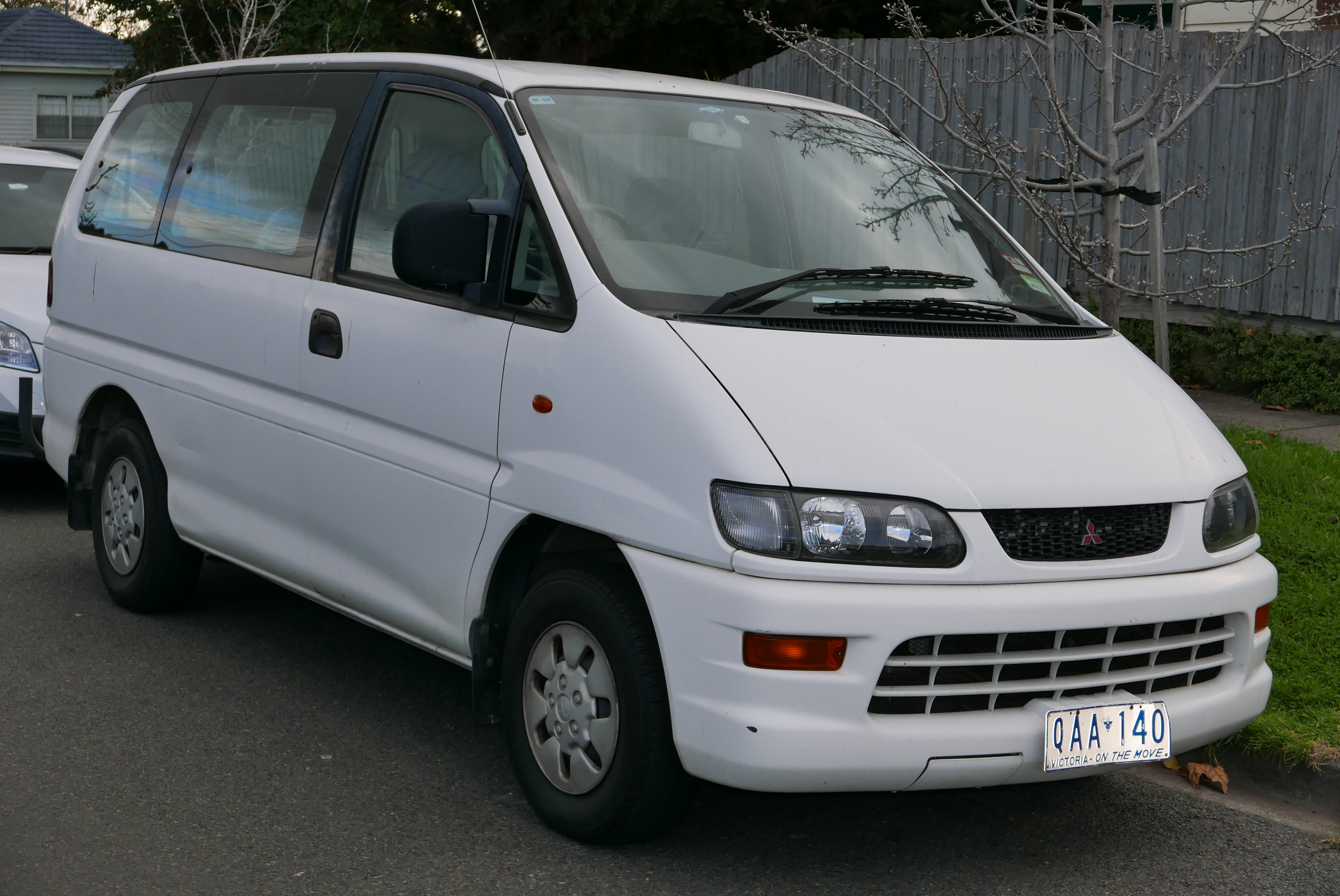
1999 Mitsubishi Starwagon GLX (Australia)

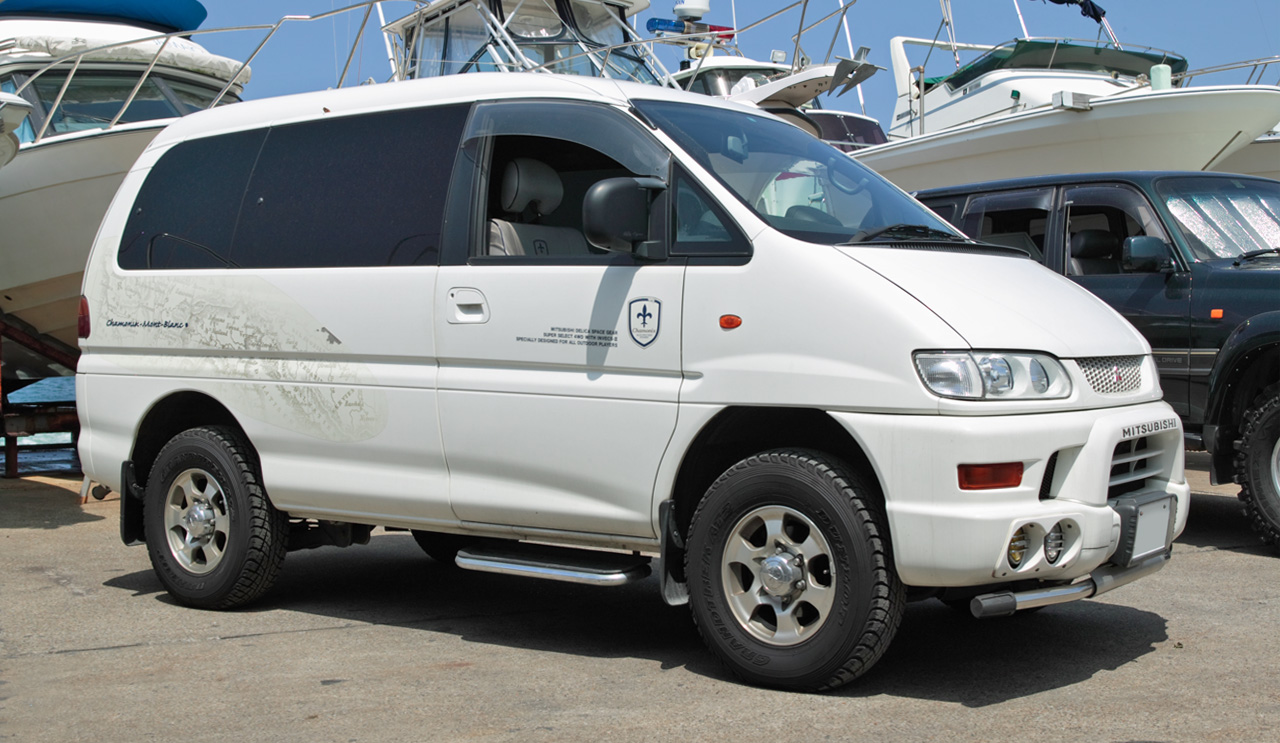
Mitsubishi Delica Space Gear Chamonix Mont-Blanc (Japan)

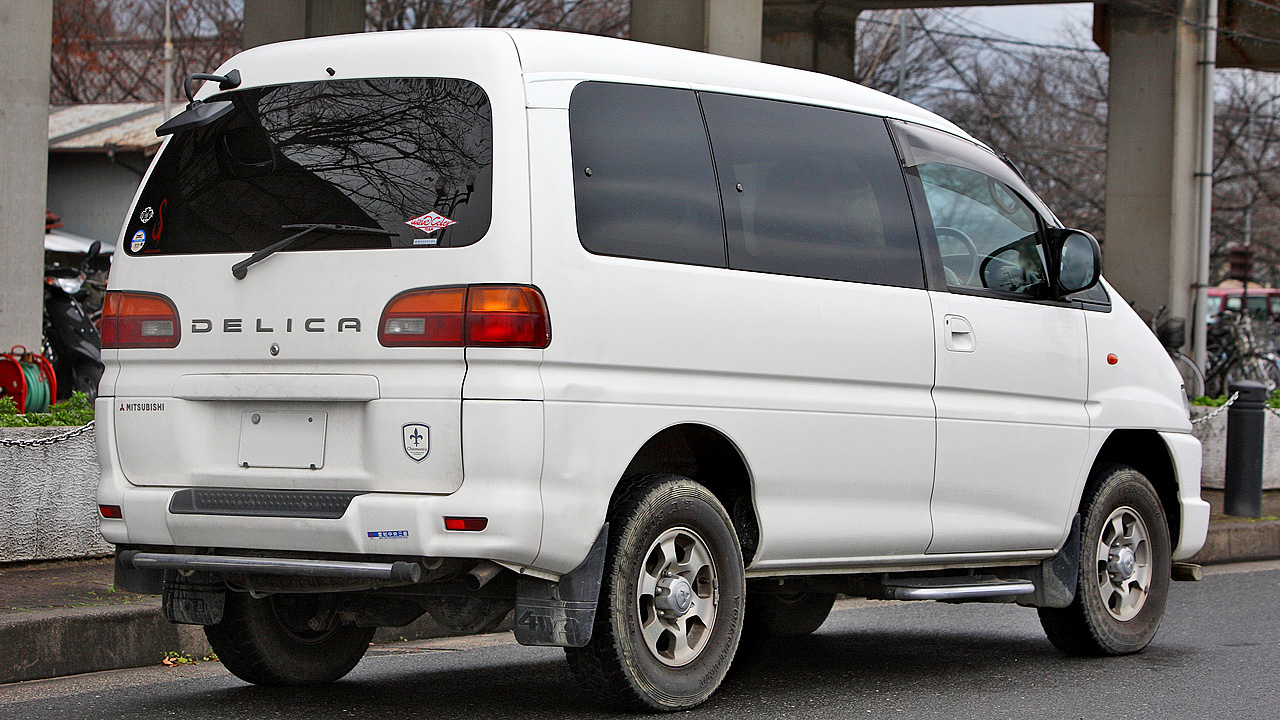
Mitsubishi Delica Space Gear Chamonix (Japan)

=== 2003–2008 Taiwanese facelift ===
In Taiwan, the third generation Delica continued to be produced and sold while the fourth generation Delica was simply named the Mitsubishi Space Gear, and was positioned above the third generation model. Initial versions of the Space Gear produced and sold in Taiwan was identical to the Series 2 Japanese facelift. However, in 2005 a final facelift was conducted exclusively in Taiwan with minor changes done to the grilles, front and rear bumpers, and front and rear light units.

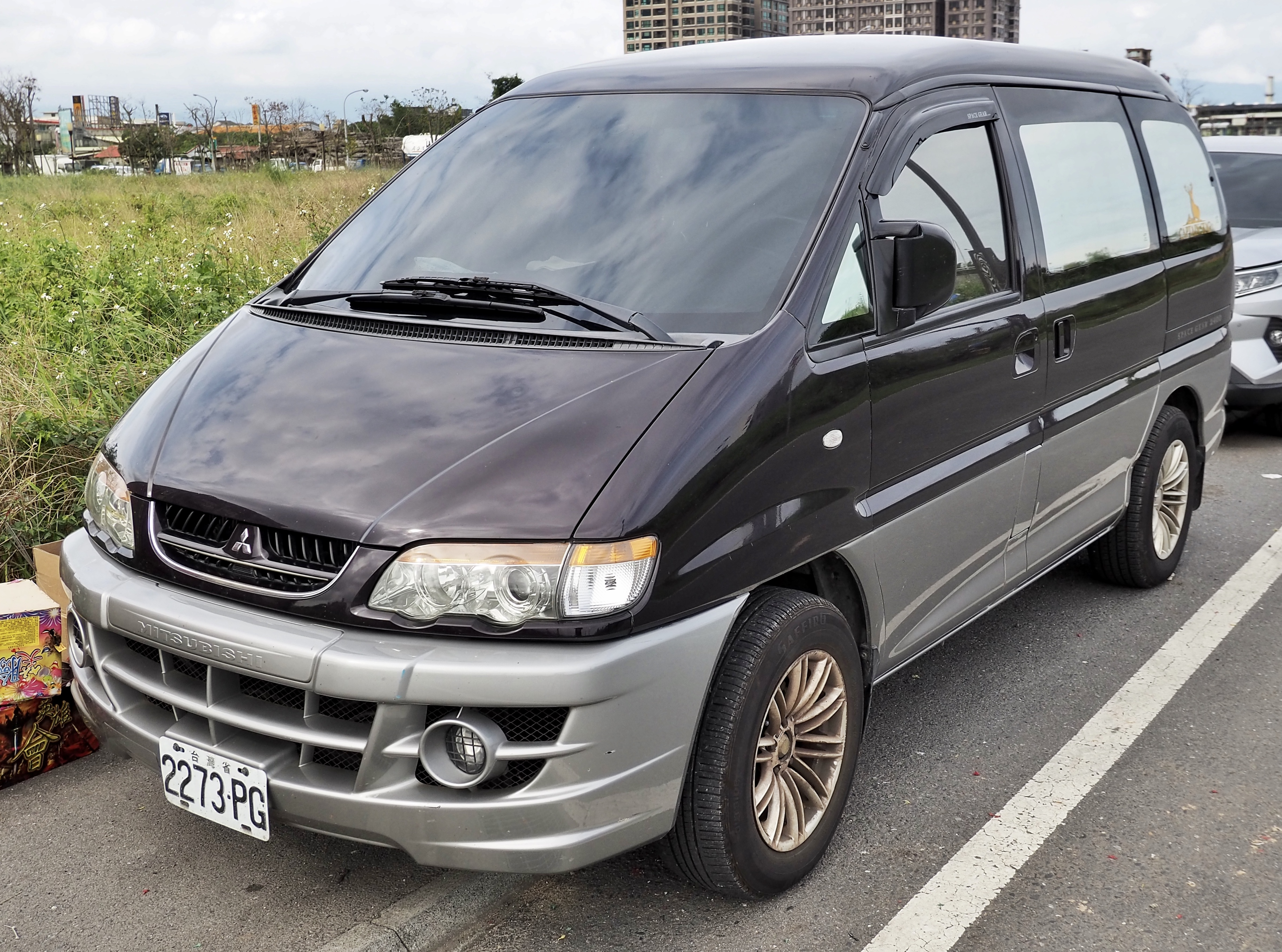
Mitsubishi Space Gear (2003 facelift)

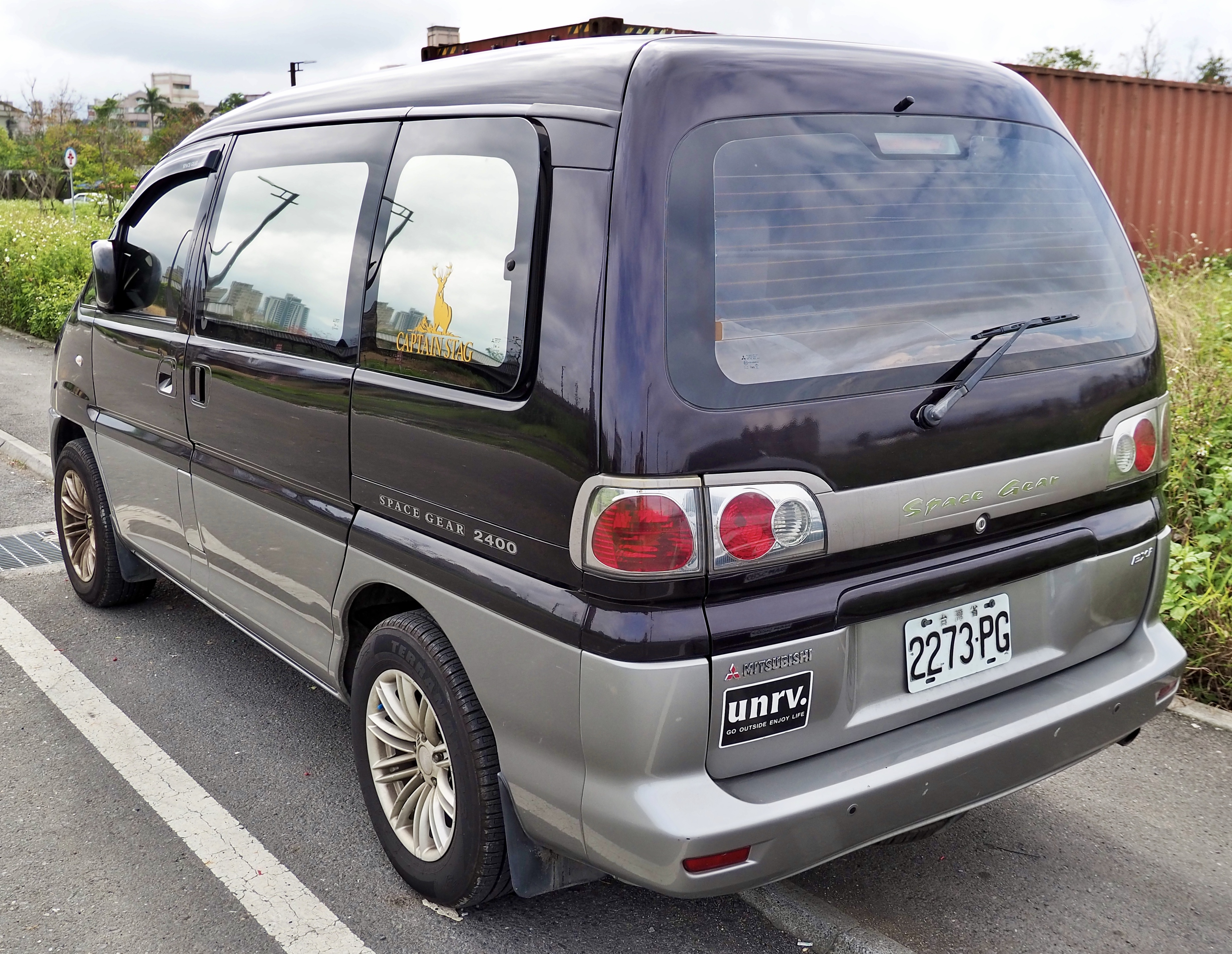
Mitsubishi Space Gear (2003 facelift)

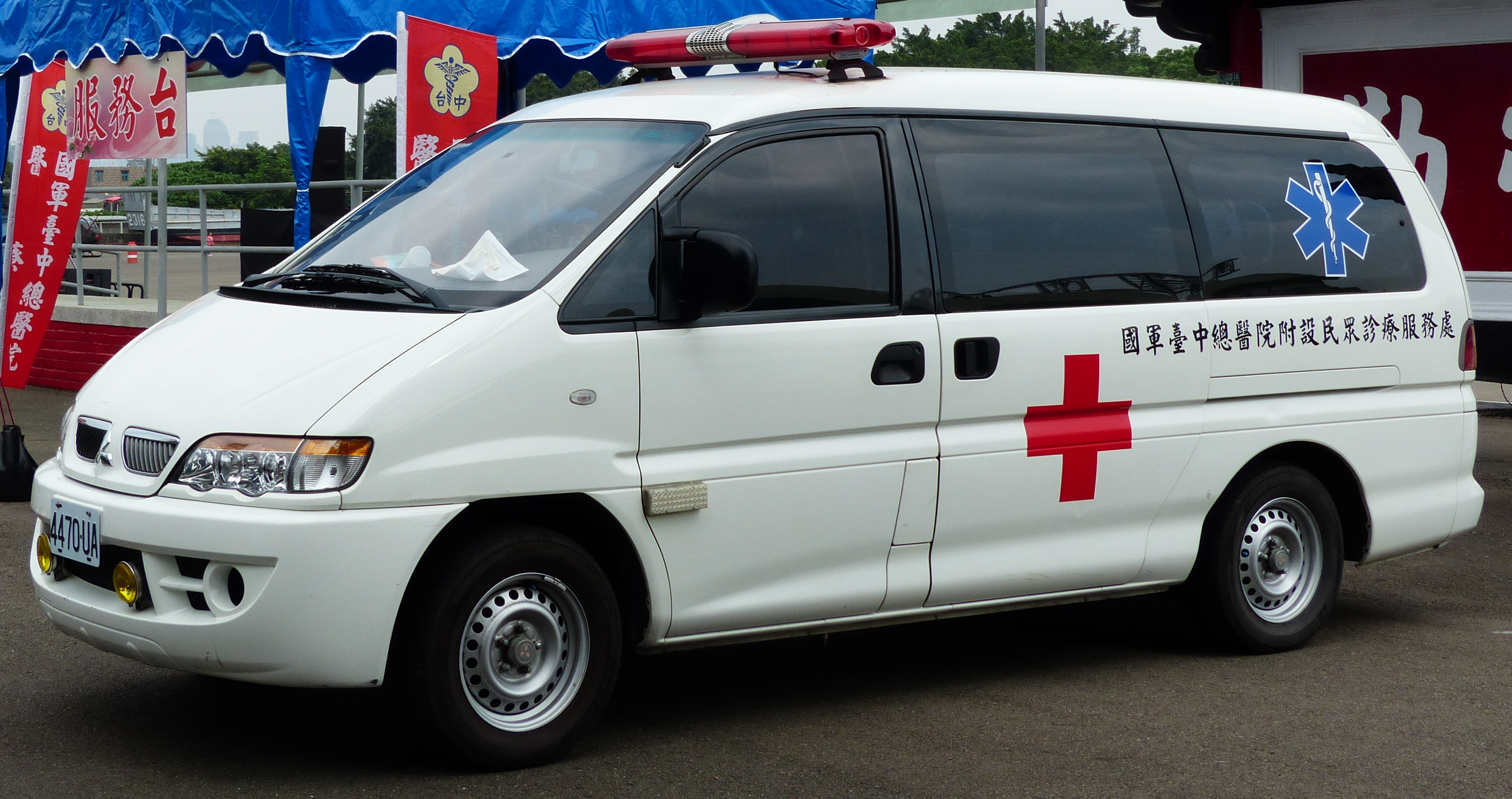
Mitsubishi Space Gear LWB (2005 facelift)

=== China ===
The Dongfeng Fengxing Lingzhi is a range of MPVs produced by Dongfeng Liuzhou Motor under the Dongfeng Fengxing sub-brand. At launch, the Fengxing Lingzhi was essentially a rebadged third generation Mitsubishi Delica or the Mitsubishi Delica Space Gear. The Delica platform was acquired from Taiwan's China Motor Corporation, a partner of Mitsubishi Motors. Therefore, the initial facelifts from Dongfeng Liuzhou were identical to the Taiwanese China Motor Corporation built Mitsubishi Space Gear. After the China Motor Corporation built Mitsubishi Space Gears were discontinued in Taiwan, Dongfeng Liuzhou continued the production in China and conducted their own facelifts and development of the model.

Three trim levels were developed after the facelift by Dongfeng Liuzhou was conducted, including the Lingzhi M5, M3, and V3, which targets different groups of consumers and were priced differently. The M5 is the premium version, featuring a restyled front DRG and restyled tail lamps with prices ranging from 77,900 yuan to 98,900 yuan. The M3 being the basic passenger version sharing the same front DRG design and same tail lamps with the V3 but with clear DLO with prices ranging from 55,900 yuan to 71,900 yuan. The V3 is the utility cargo version with a sealed cargo area and being the most affordable of the three trim levels with prices ranging from 55,900 yuan to 66,900 yuan. Each trim is available with a long wheelbase version called the Lingzhi M5L, M3L, and V3L respectively all sharing the same tail lamp design.

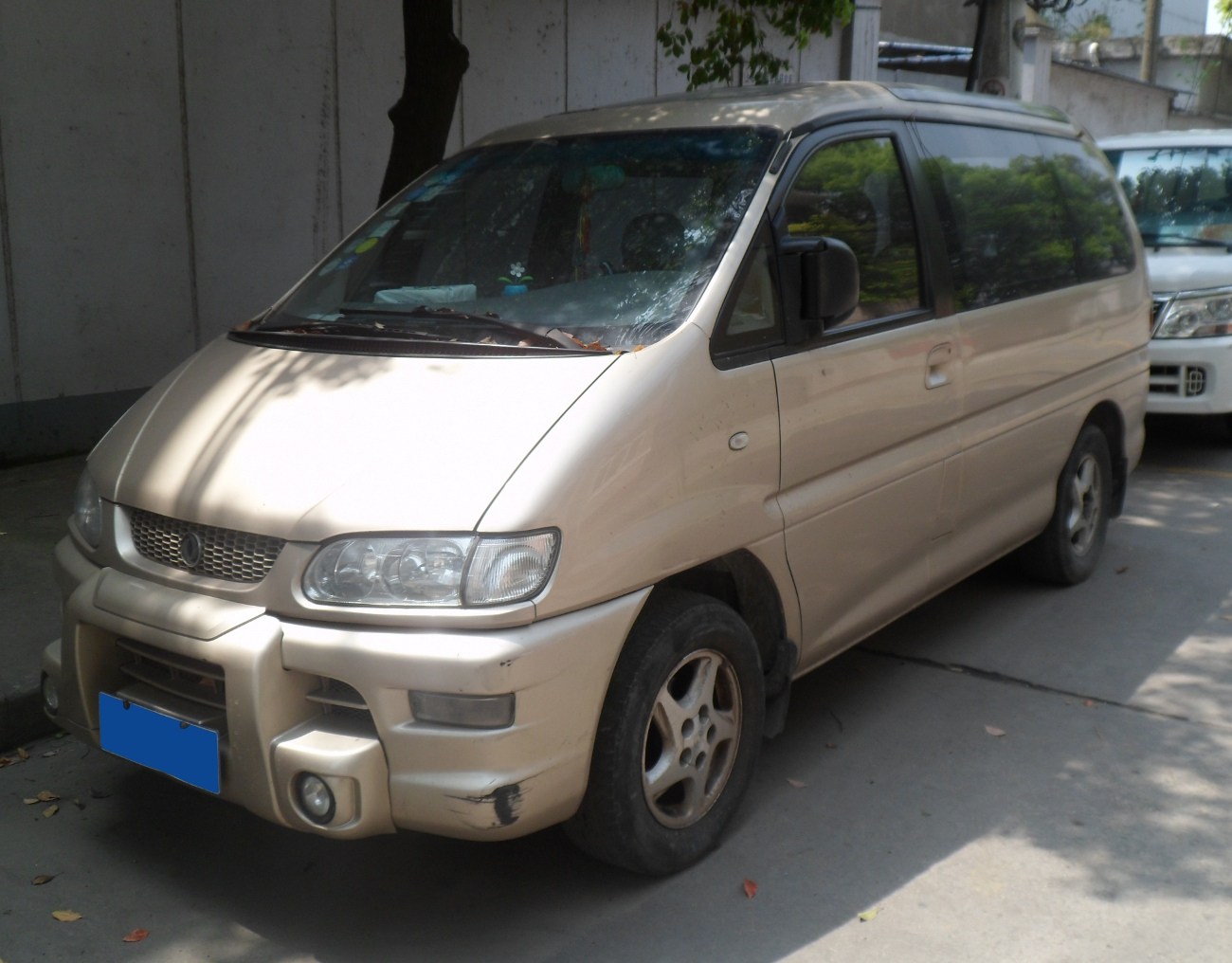
Dongfeng Fengxing Lingzhi (Mk1)

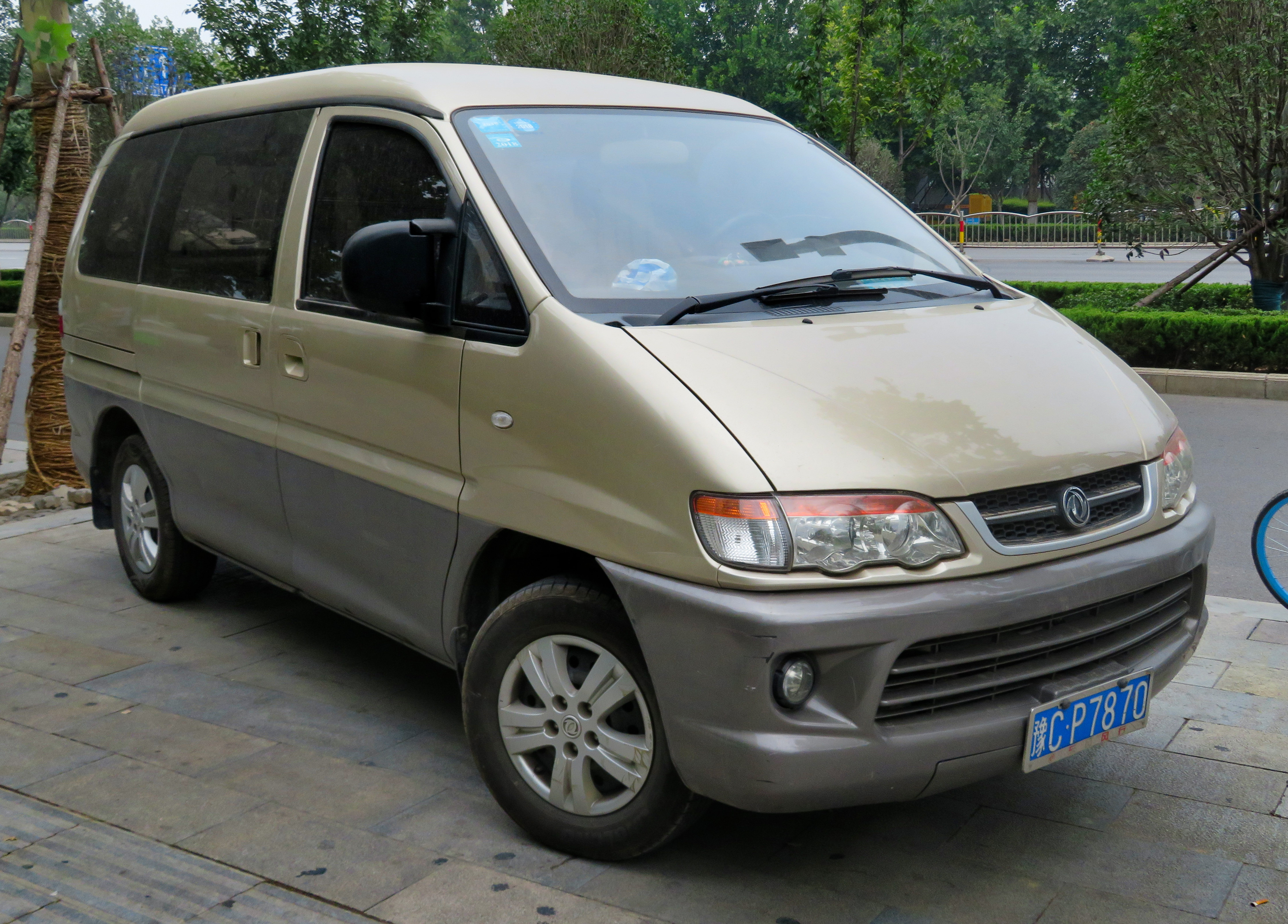
Dongfeng Fengxing Lingzhi (Mk2)

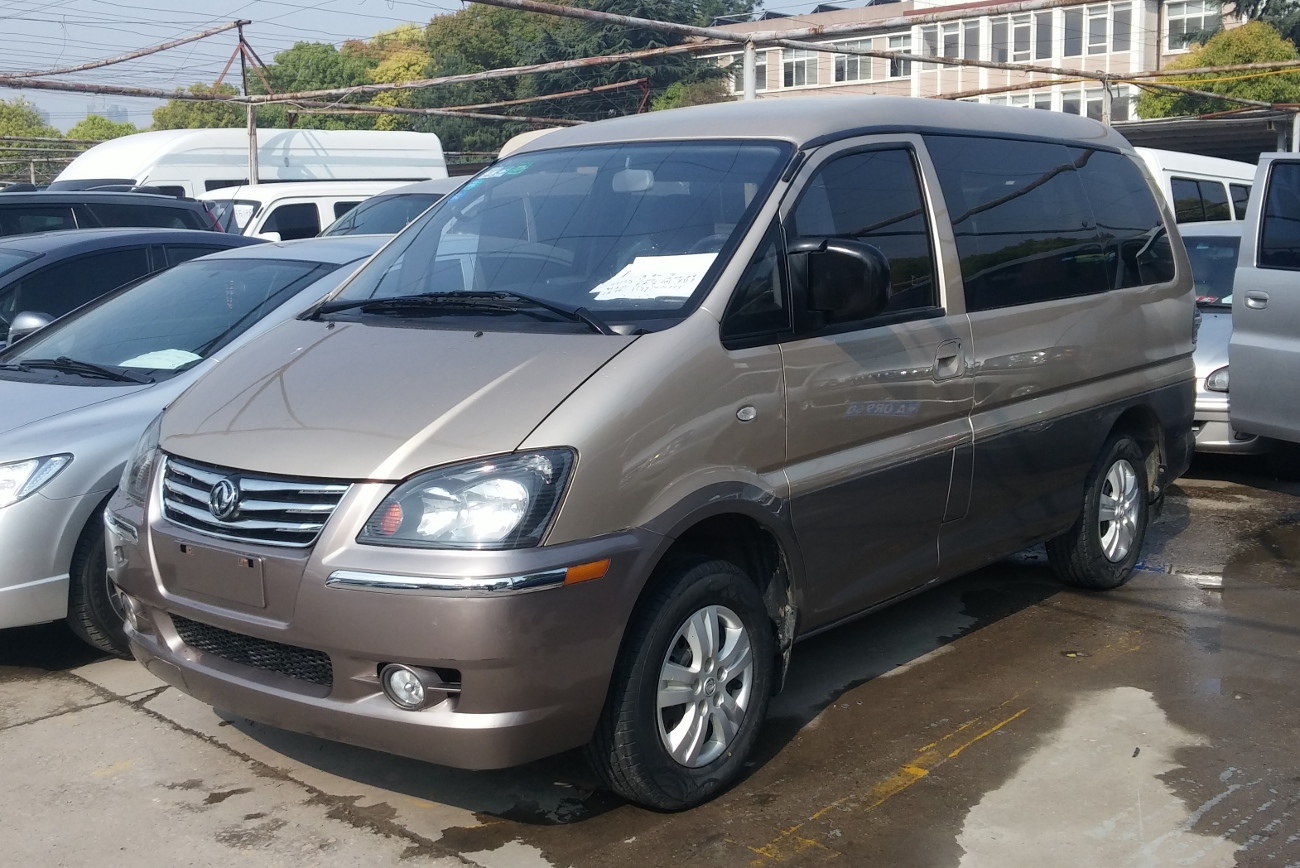
Dongfeng Fengxing Lingzhi (M3)

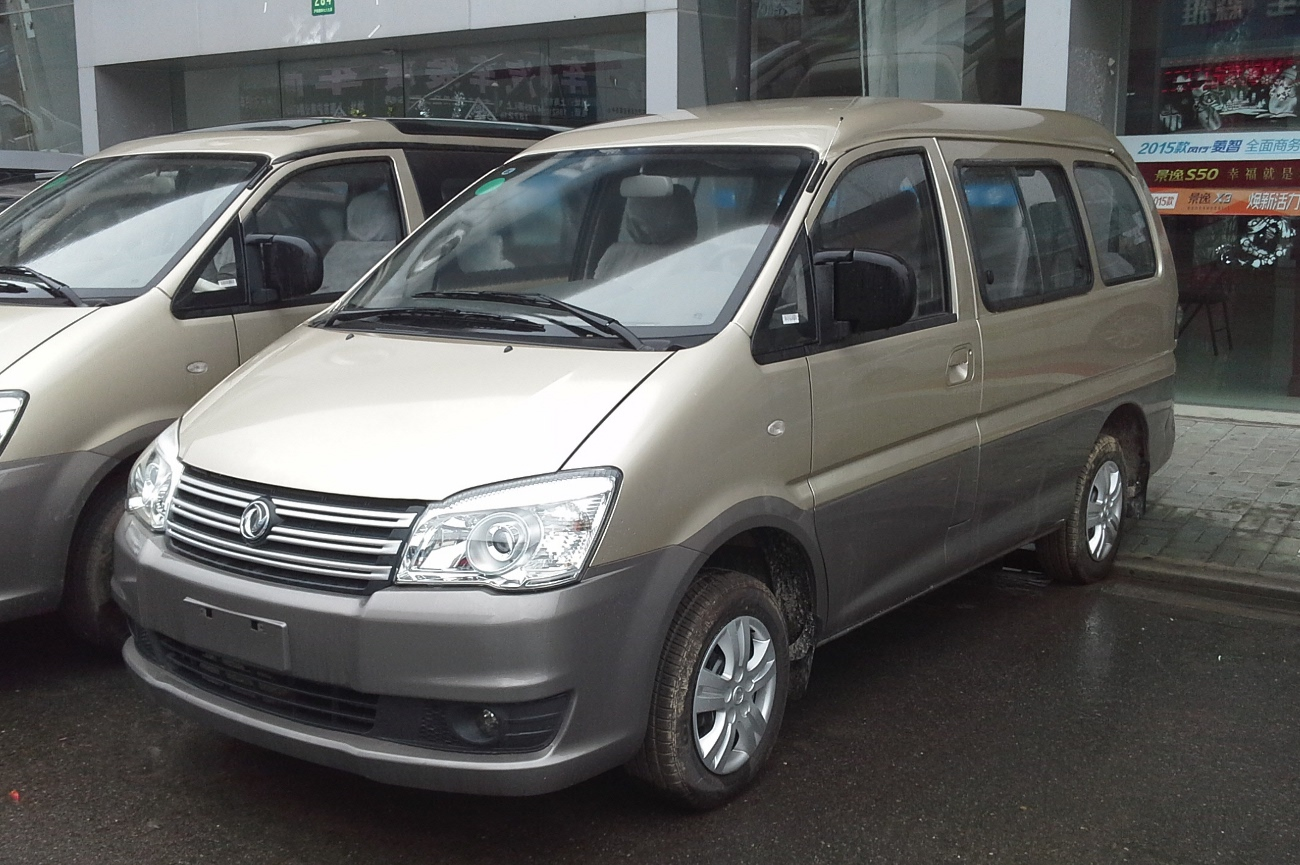
Dongfeng Fengxing Lingzhi (M5)

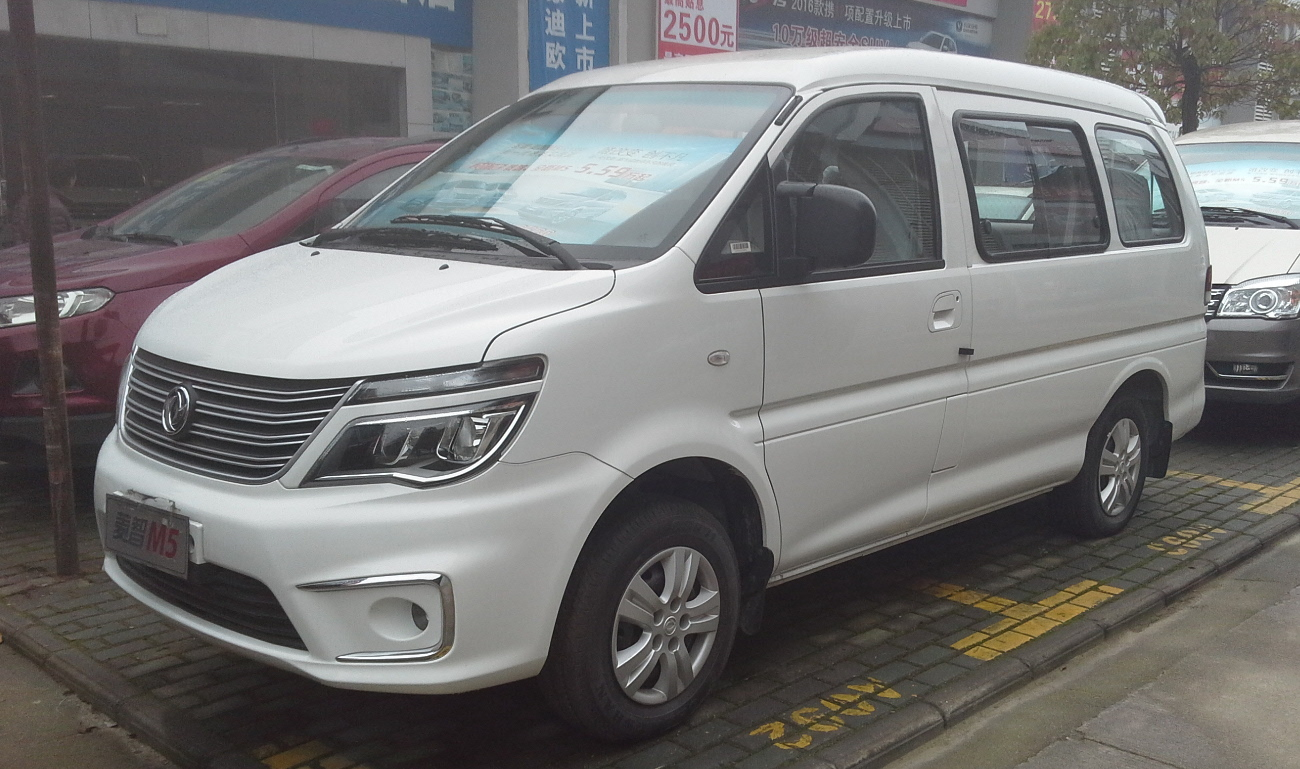
Dongfeng Fengxing Lingzhi (M5) facelift

== Fifth generation (2007) ==
Fifth generation (D:5)
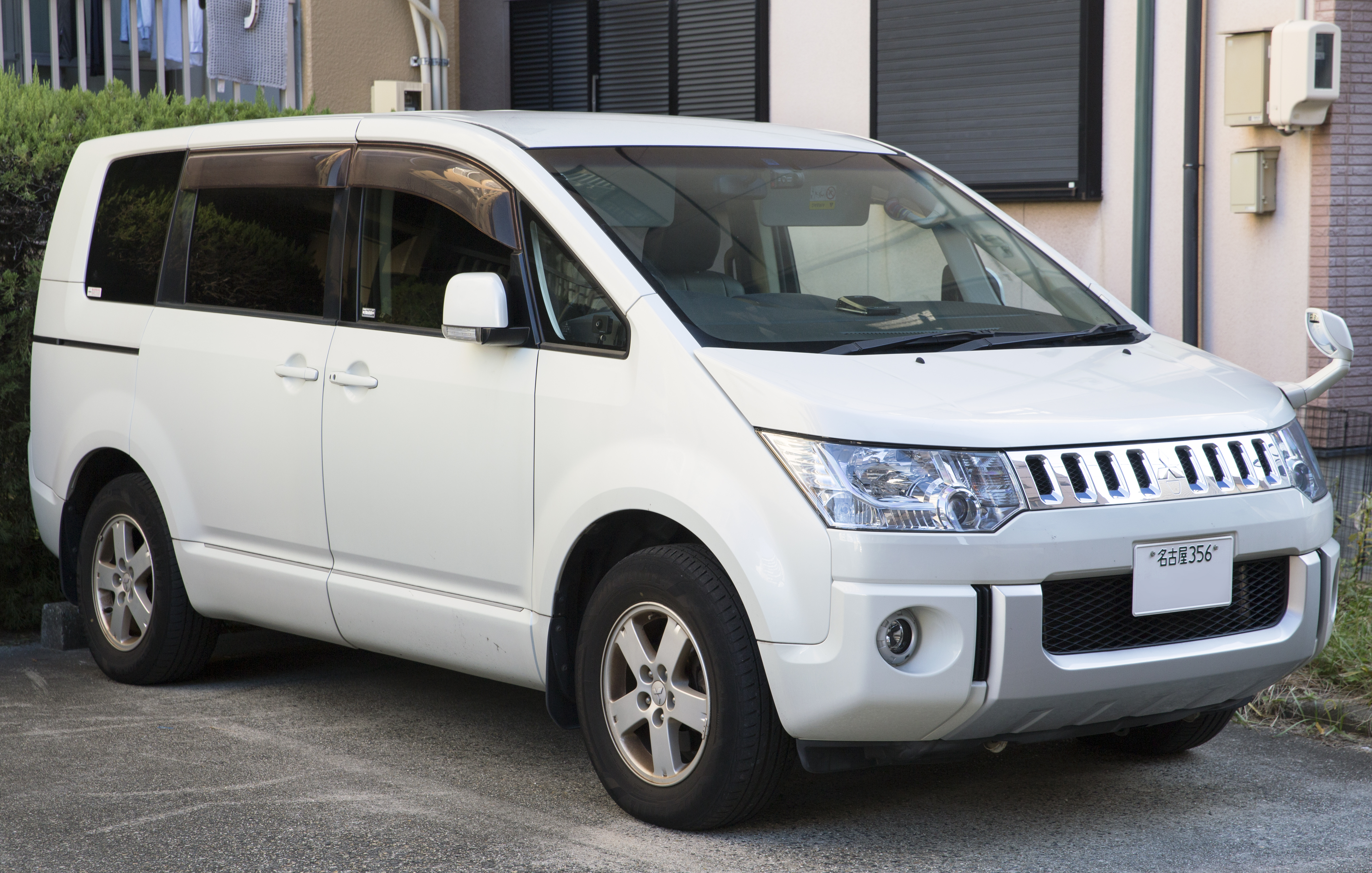
- Mitsubishi Delica D:5 (Japan; pre-facelift)

Overview
- Production: January 2007 – present
- Assembly: Japan: Sakahogi, Gifu (Pajero Manufacturing Co., Ltd) (2007–2021); Okazaki, Aichi (Okazaki Plant) (2021–present)
- Designer: Akinori Nakanishi

Body and chassis
- Class: Large MPV / Minivan (M)
- Body style: 5-door van
- Layout: Front-engine, front-wheel-drive; Front-engine, four-wheel-drive
- Platform: Mitsubishi GS platform
- Related: Mitsubishi Outlander

Powertrain
- Engine: Petrol: 1998 cc 4B11 I4; 1998 cc 4J11 I4; 2359 cc 4B12 I4; Diesel: 2268 cc 4N14 I4 turbo-diesel
- Transmission: CVT INVECS-III automatic (petrol); 6-speed automatic 8-speed Aisin AWF8F automatic

Dimensions
- Wheelbase: 2,850 mm (112.2 in)
- Length: 4,730 mm (186.2 in) (pre-facelift); 4,800 mm (189.0 in) (2019 facelift)
- Width: 1,795 mm (70.7 in)
- Height: FWD: 1,850 mm (72.8 in); AWD: 1,870–1,875 mm (73.6–73.8 in)
- Curb weight: FWD: 1,680–1,740 kg (3,704–3,836 lb); AWD: 1,770–1,980 kg (3,902–4,365 lb)

Chronology
- Predecessor: Mitsubishi Grandis/Space Wagon

On 30 October 2006, Mitsubishi announced that the 2007 Delica would be internally designated D:5, and would make its official launch in the Japanese market on 31 January 2007. Bodily configured as a 5-door monobox minivan, petrol Delica models arrived in 2007, while diesel models started production in late 2012 as 2013 models. Available in front- or all-wheel drive configuration using Mitsubishi's AWC system, the Delica is available in both seven- or eight-seating layouts.

The basis of the D:5 is the Mitsubishi GS platform which it shares with the Xpander as well as the second and third generation of the Outlander. The Delica D:5's facelift for the 2019 model year was unveiled on 21 November 2018. It made its debut to the public at the 2019 Tokyo Auto Salon and was released in Japan on 15 February 2019.

=== Development and launch ===
On 30 October 2006, Mitsubishi Motors announced that the next generation of its monobox (one-box) minivan would be called the Delica D:5, based on the Concept D-5 prototype first exhibited at the 39th Tokyo Motor Show in 2005. It is an eight-seater, that features Mitsubishi's AWC four-wheel drive system and an INVECS-III continuously variable transmission, coupled to a 4B12 2.4 L MIVEC inline-four engine. Based on a new global GS platform, the new Delica features Mitsubishi's next-generation RISE safety body. A 2.0-litre version of this engine is also available. It was released in Japan on 31 January 2007.

Available for January 2013 is the clean diesel variant of the D:5, which comes with Mitsubishi's brand new 2.2 L 4-cylinder turbo-diesel engine (4N14) that produces 148 PS of power and 360 Nm of torque. Mitsubishi claims that this new 4N14 diesel engine is reliable at low revs and smooth acceleration until high revs. With reduced pressure and temperature in the cylinder, it achieves a low compression ratio of 14.9. The Mitsubishi Delica D:5 with Clean Diesel engine has a fuel consumption of 13.6 km/L based on JC08 Mode cycle.

The Delica D:5 was officially sold in Indonesia between 2014 and 2019, where it was imported from Japan. It was launched on 18 September 2014 at the 22nd Indonesia International Motor Show, marketed as the "Delica". It is only available in FWD petrol engine variant based on 2.0 G Power Package 2WD trim with seven-seater seating configuration. The variant called Royal was added later and it was based on G-Premium package with same engine. It was also introduced in Thailand in March 2015 as the "Delica Space Wagon".

=== Body and exterior ===
The exterior features a large bar grille which connects the headlights, as well as the rear which incorporates a tailgate garnish, which runs the full-width of the rear side. The D:5 features front and rear bumpers that include skid plate styling and use a functional sectional design that facilitates repair work for a small amount of damage. Retaining its basic dimensions from the previous model, the D:5's overall height has decreased by about 100 mm (3.9 in), while its interior height has increased also by about 100 mm (3.9 in). It also has 20 mm (0.79 in) higher ground clearance. Fourteen distinct body colours are available; seven monotone colours, while seven two-tone colours are available. Sized as a large MPV / minivan, the Delica is placed in the M-segment in British size classification. The Delica's estimated drag coefficient is 0.42 C_{d}, which is relatively high in comparison to its competitors such as the Toyota Alphard AH30 at only 0.33.

The Delica also features the "rib-bone frame" design uses closed-section joins to link the pillars, roof bows and underfloor cross-members in rings positioned at the pillars and the tailgate opening, which improves body rigidity and durability as well as to help prevent crashworthiness. The vehicle uses more rust-resistant steel on the floor structure than the Delica Space Gear, which was a fourth generation model. The D:5 also utilizes body corrosion resistance, which has been improved significantly due to extensive use of underfloor sealing and with the application of more undercoat. Fender panels, which are made of plastic resin are used on the D:5, and are able to bend and recover shape easily. This switch of material reduces weight by 4 kg (8.8 lb).

Power sliding rear doors and an electric tailgate are now standard. An available exterior feature is a "Triple Panorama Sunroof", which offers a trio of sunroofs, where two tilt and one power slides.

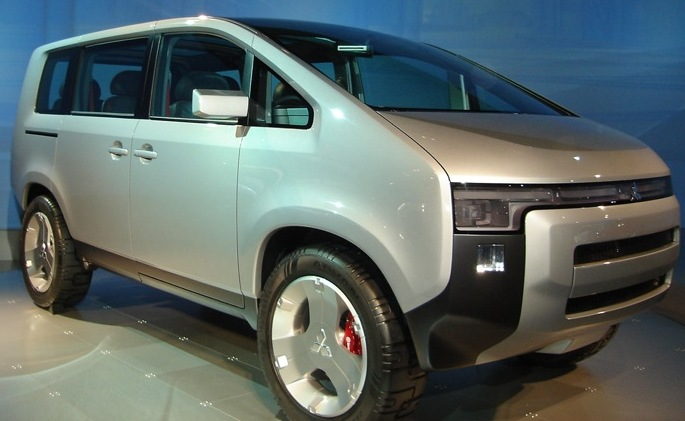
Mitsubishi Concept D5

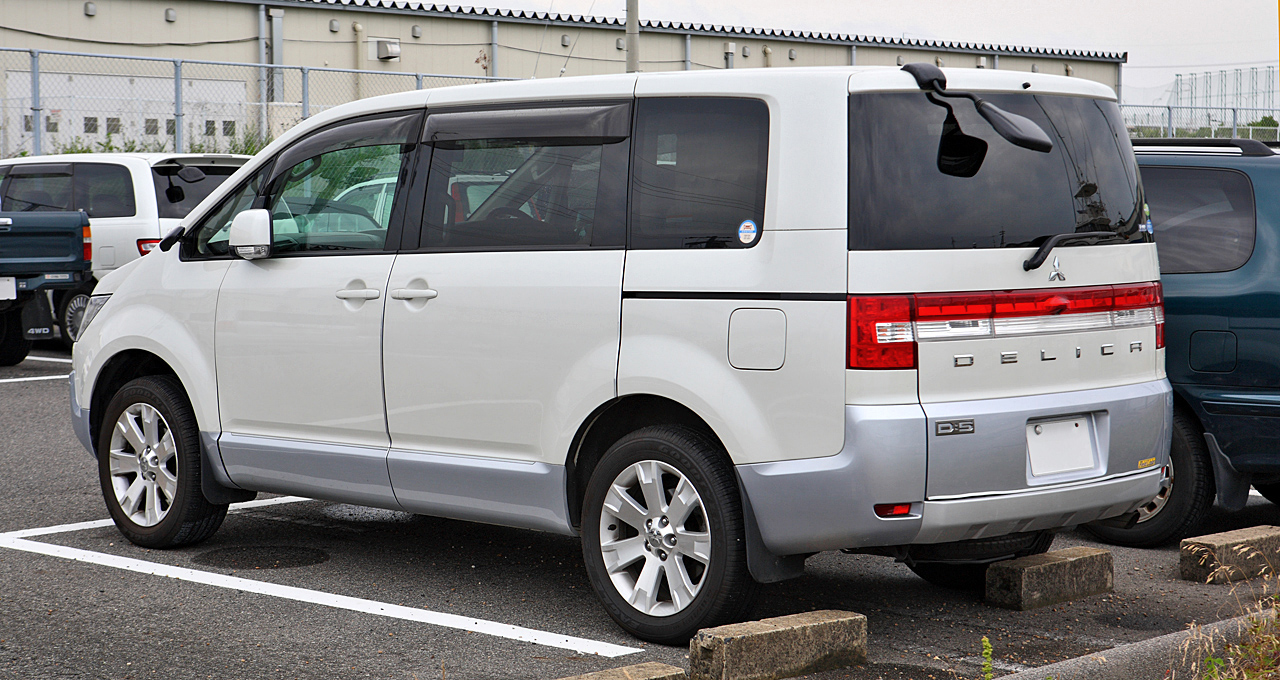
Rear view

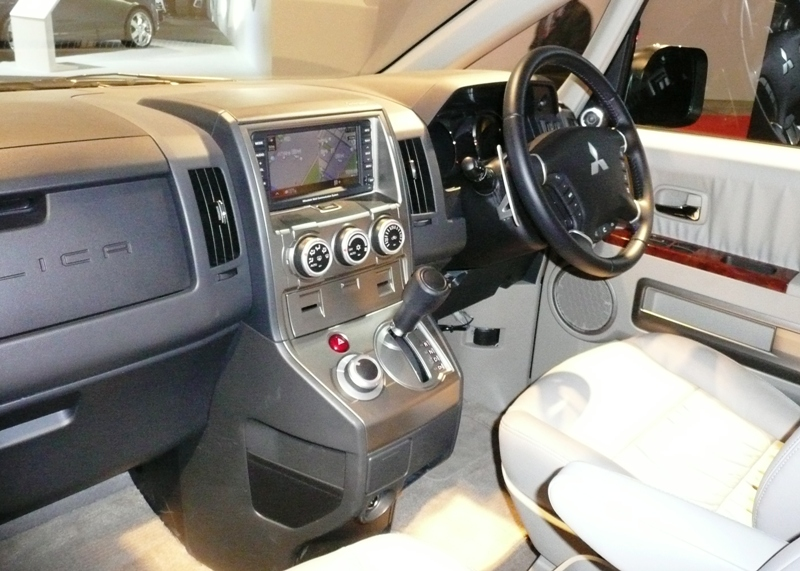
Interior

=== Equipment ===
Standard equipment includes Xenon HID headlights, 3x SRS airbags for the passenger, driver, and the driver's knee, anti-lock braking system (ABS), electronic brakeforce distribution (EBD), Active Stability Control, which is a Mitsubishi's variant of electronic stability control, dual-way air conditioning, headlining that removes the smell of odors, UV-cut glass, interior illumination with adjustable LED lamp system, and start-stop system for the turbo diesel. Available features are either single or dual power sliding side doors, parking cameras, power folding side step, Rockford Fosgate Premium sound system with an 860W amplifier, 12 speakers with Dolby Digital 5.1 surround sound, airbags for all three rows of seats, luxury driver seats, smart key, cruise control, and a steering wheel with optionally mounted phone and buttons.

Standard on G-Premium and G-Navi package, is a 30-gigabyte hard disk drive on-board navigation system as well as 7-inch liquid-crystal display. A 9-inch wide display with a built-in DVD/CD player and infrared headphones are mounted on the rear cabin ceiling as an optional luxury on the G-Premium and G-Navi models.

All models except the M trim are equipped with 225/55R18 tires on light and stiff 7-spoke alloy road wheels. The M trim features 215/70R16 tires on steel wheels with full wheel covers. The Delica D:5 features the MacPherson strut suspension at the front, while at the rear is a multi-link suspension setup.

=== 2019 facelift ===
The 2019 facelift Delica D:5 was unveiled in Japan on 21 November 2018 with the "Dynamic Shield" design language, having a 10.1-inch infotainment system and e-Assist.

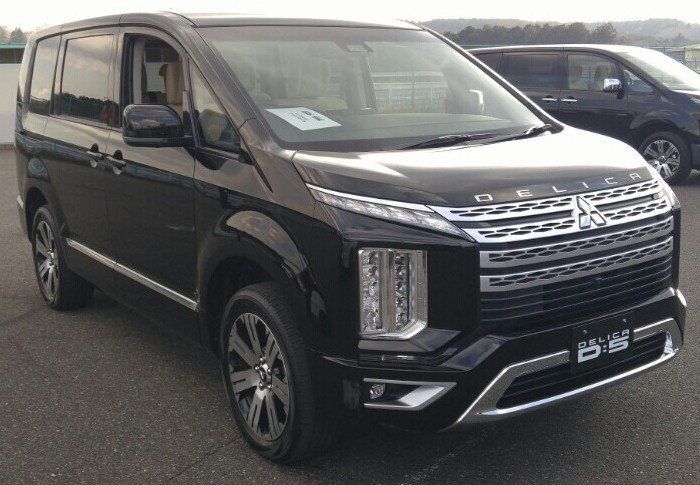
2019 Mitsubishi Delica D:5 2.2 DI-D

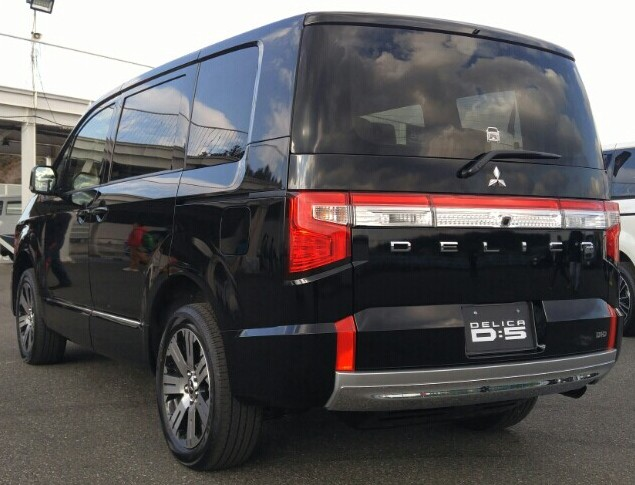
2019 Mitsubishi Delica D:5 2.2 DI-D

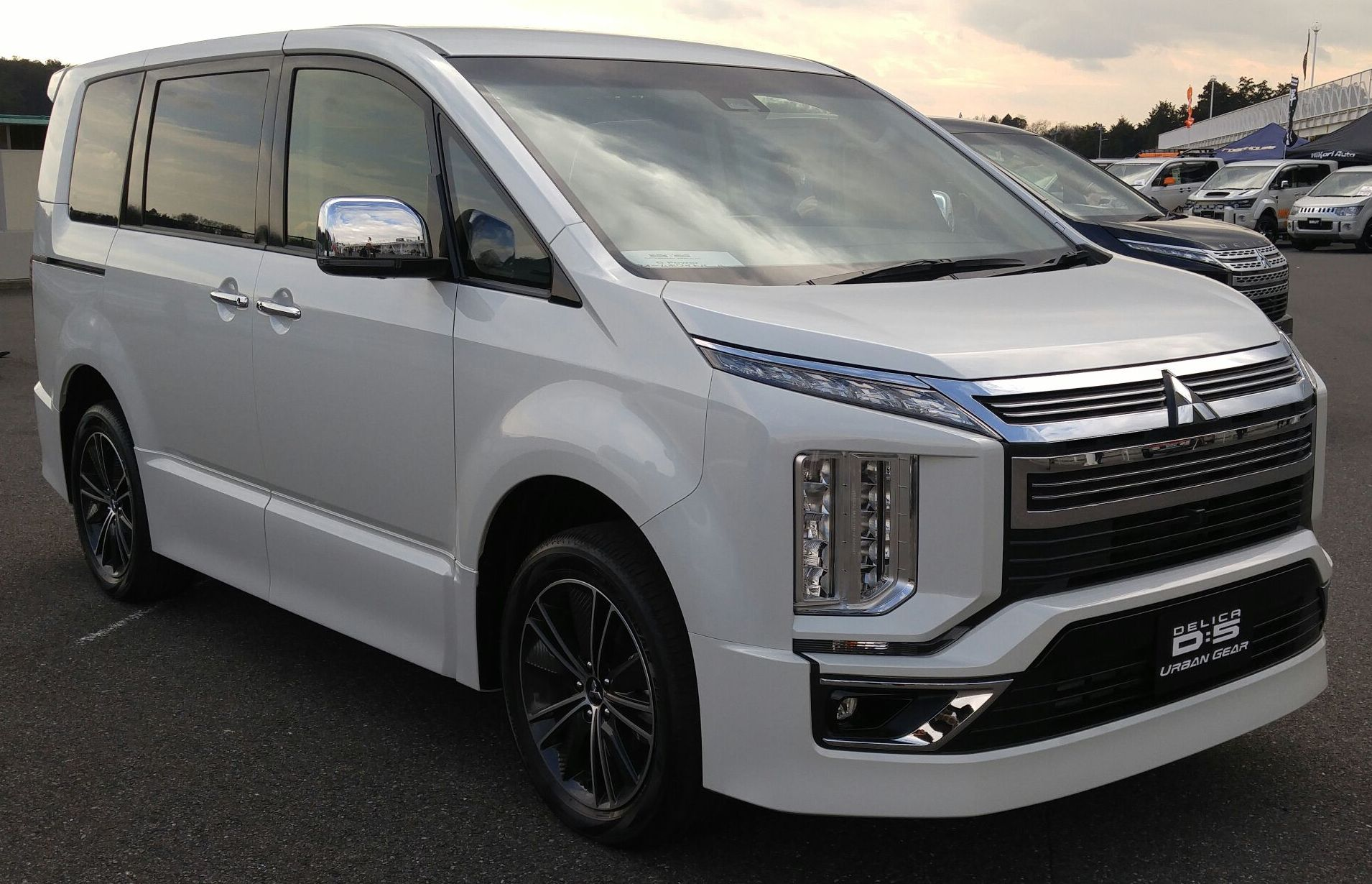
2019 Mitsubishi Delica D:5 Urban Gear 2.2 DI-D

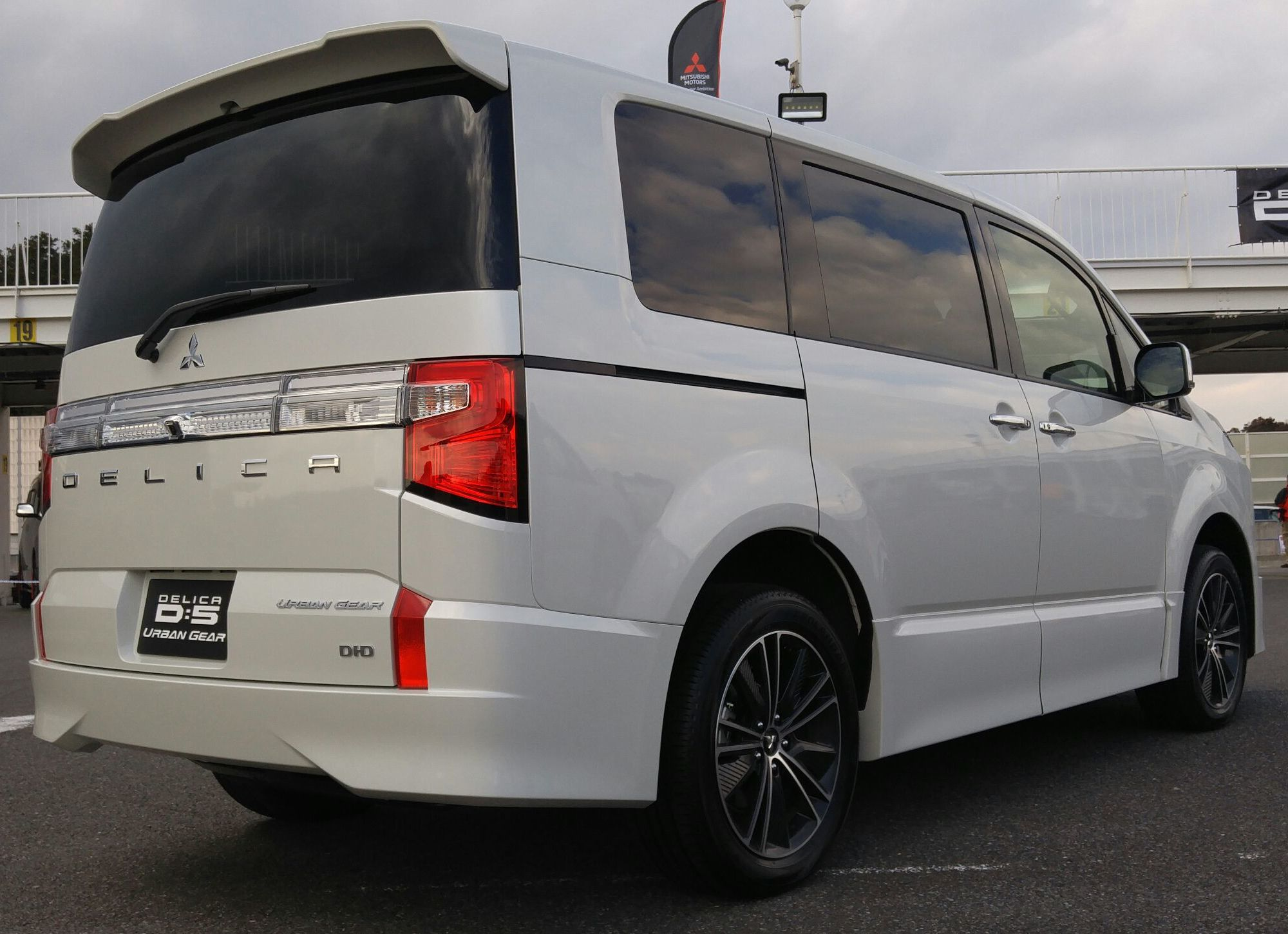
2019 Mitsubishi Delica D:5 Urban Gear 2.2 DI-D

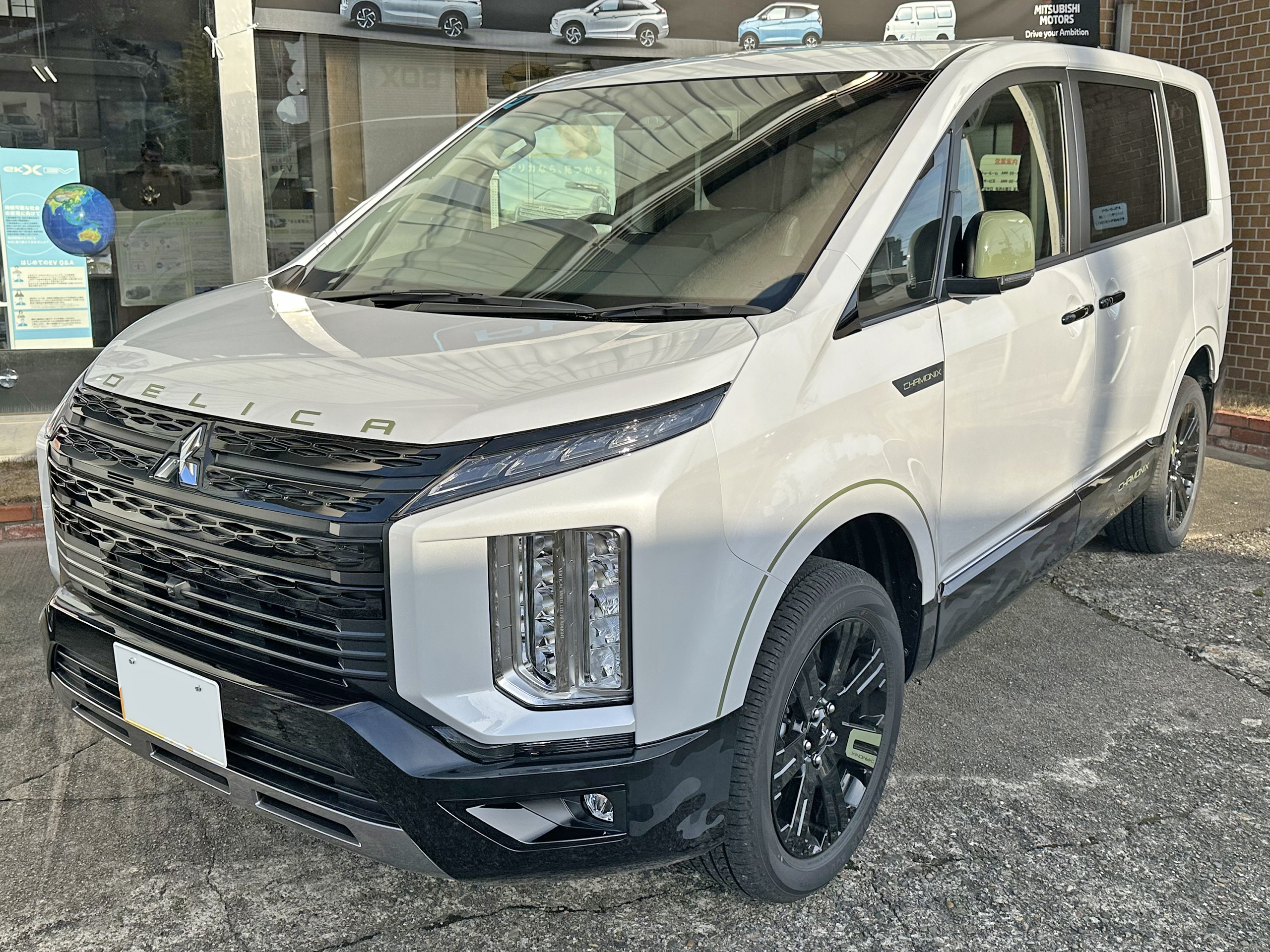
2023 Mitsubishi Delica D:5 Chamonix

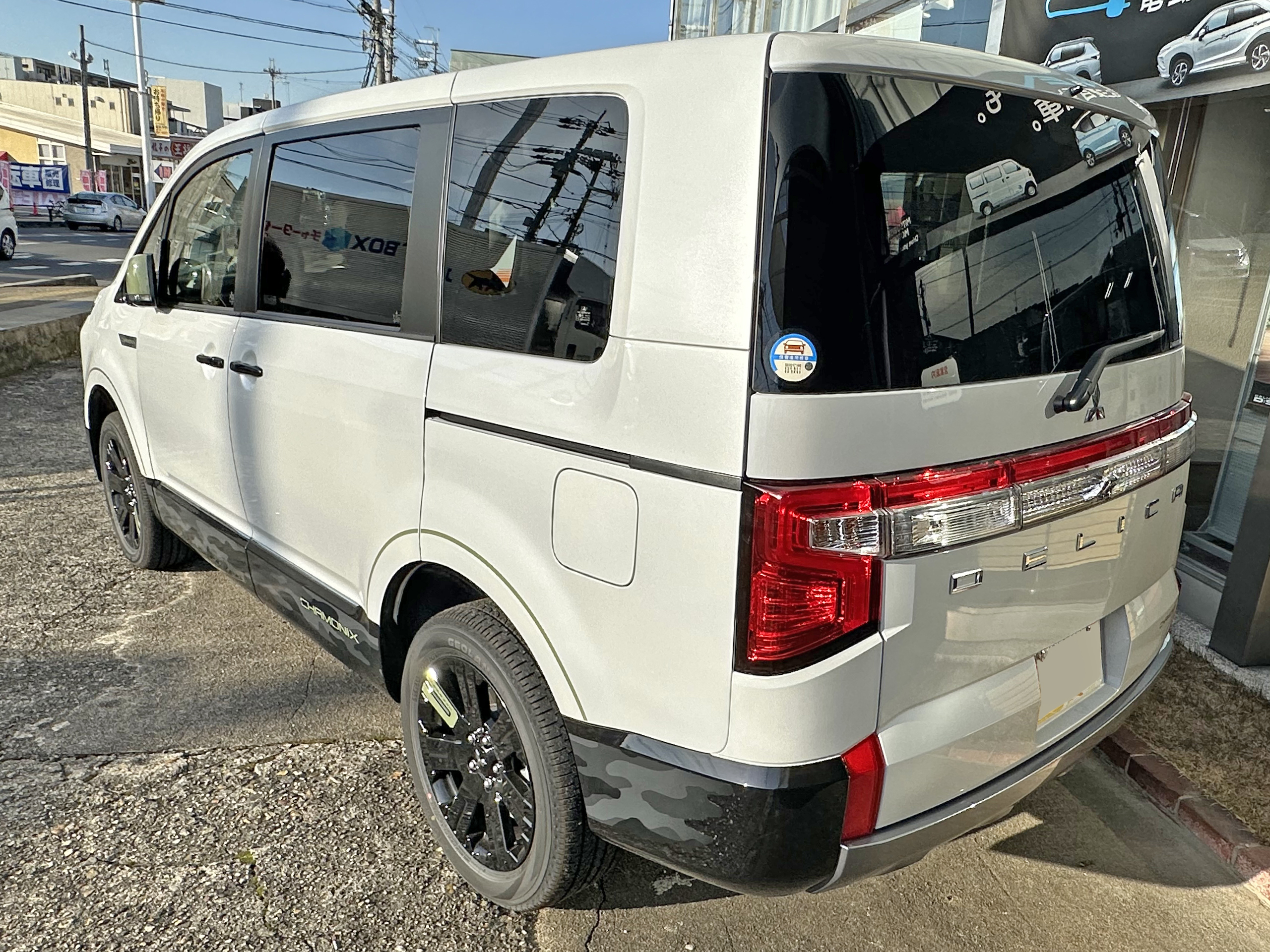
2023 Mitsubishi Delica D:5 Chamonix

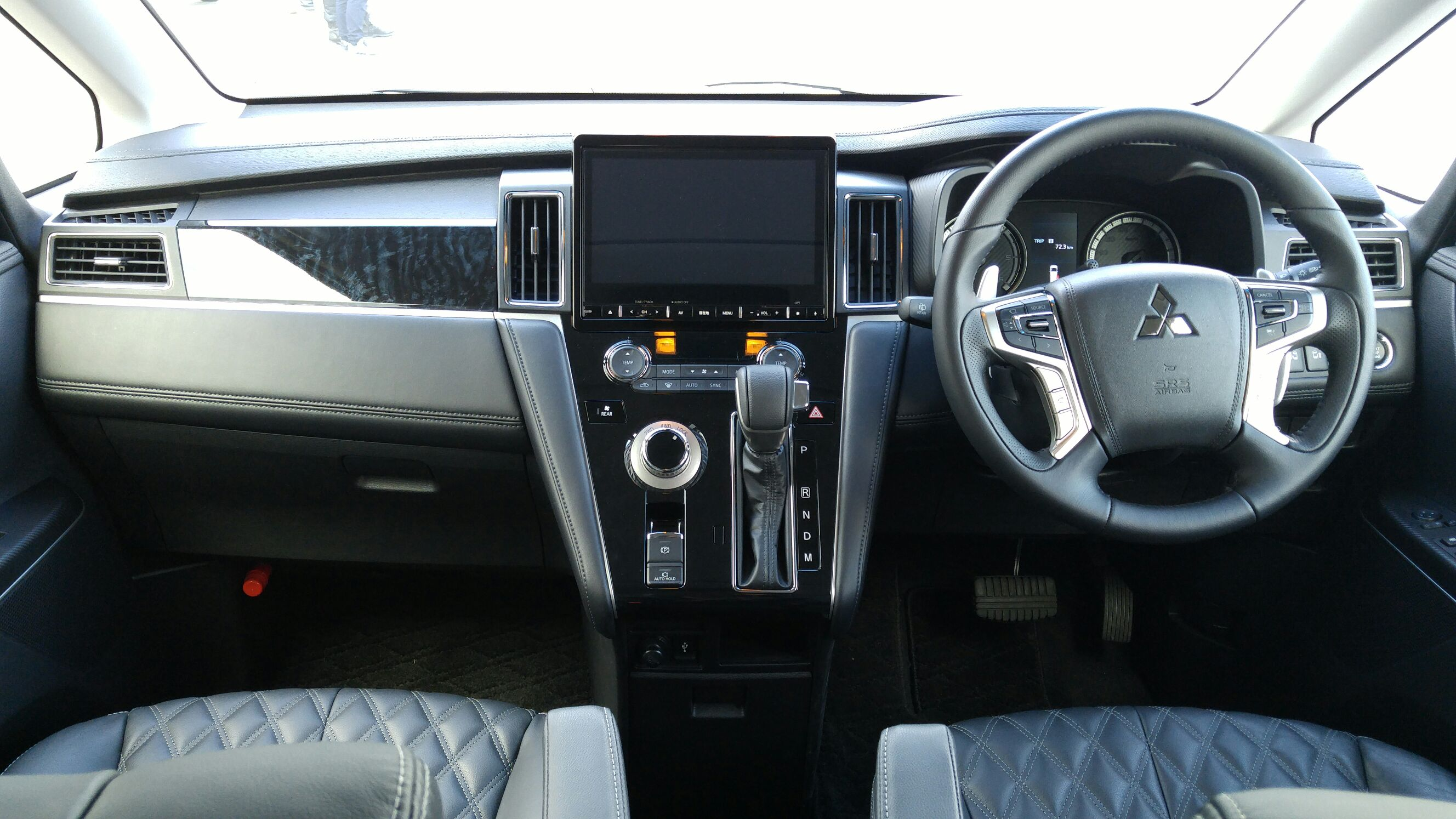
Interior (facelift)

=== 2025 facelift ===
The 2025 minor facelift Delica D:5 was unveiled at Japan Mobility Show on 29 October 2025. The grille and bumper was slightly redesigned and rear bumper. The taillights, which were previously connected on both sides of the rear gate, are now part of a rear gate garnish, and the "DELICA" logo, previously located directly below it, has been moved into the garnish, and the 18-inch aluminium wheels have been redesigned.

The interior now features a new 8-inch color LCD meter.

Delica D:5 P (second facelift)

Rear view

=== Sales ===
At the start of its market release, Mitsubishi sets monthly sales target of 2,300 units the Delica D:5 it was underperforming over the years. A few years later the sales target was decrease to 1,300 units however the Delica D:5 exceeded the target in the years of 2019, 2022 and 2023.

Year	Japan
2007	27,340
2008	18,607
2009	15,629
2010	16,852
2011	13,319
2012	13,455
2013	13,853
2014	12,169
2015	11,087
2016	10,814
2017	12,969
2018	13,502
2019	20,085
2020	11,157
2021	14,790
2022	16,838
2023	17,217

== Other models using the name ==
=== Mitsubishi Delica Truck/Van/Cargo (rebadged Mazda Bongo Truck/Van/Brawny) ===
Between November 1999 and October 2011 (the Delica Cargo was discontinued in August 2010), Mitsubishi Motors retailed a badge engineered version of the Mazda Bongo as the Delica Truck/Van (short wheelbase) and the Delica Cargo (extended wheelbase) in Japan, replacing the cargo versions of the fourth generation Delica in that market.

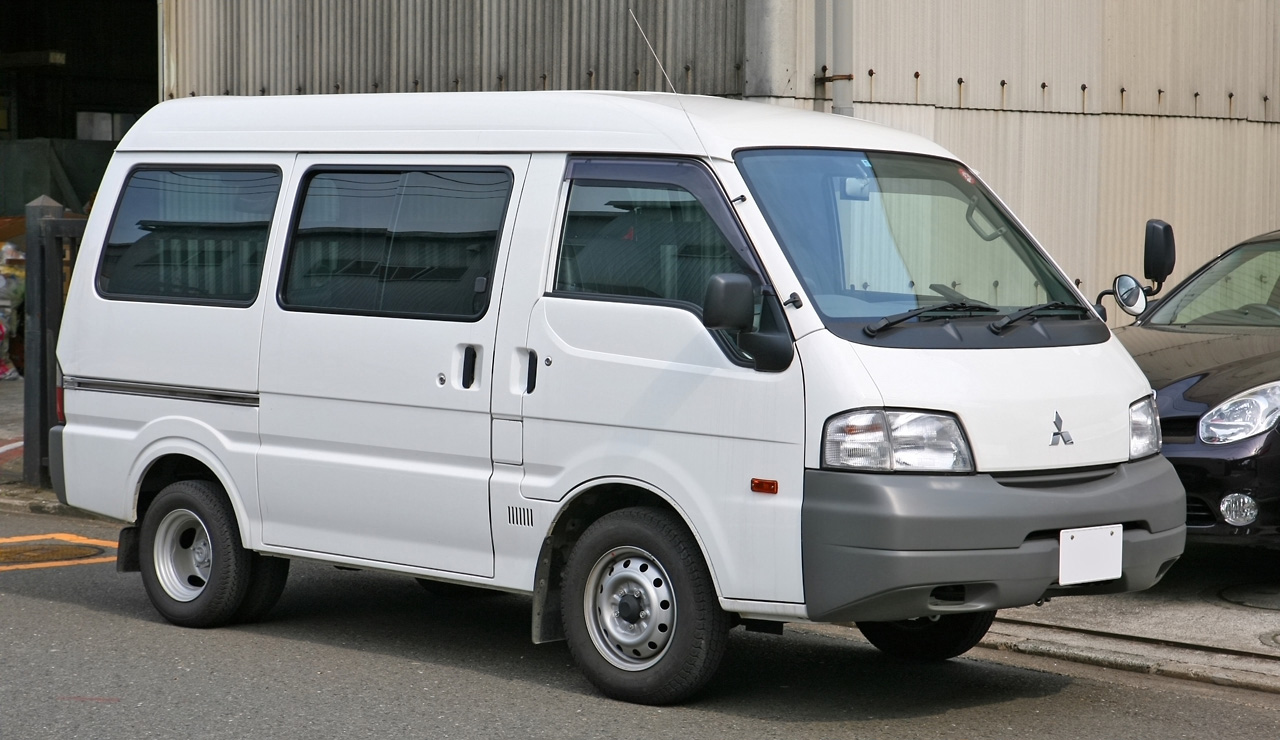
1999–2011 Mitsubishi Delica Van

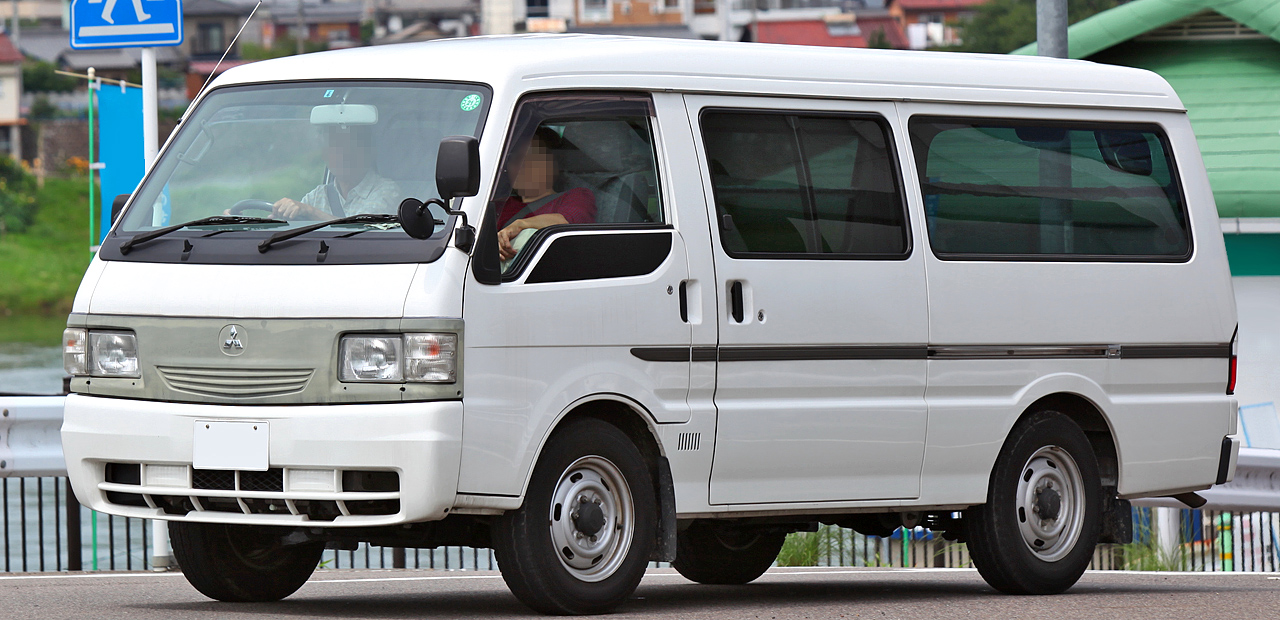
1999–2010 Mitsubishi Delica Cargo

=== Mitsubishi Delica D:3/Delica Van (rebadged Nissan NV200) ===
In October 2011, Mitsubishi Motors replaced the Mazda Bongo-based models with a badge engineered version of the Nissan NV200, sold as the Delica D:3 (wagon models) and Delica Van (van models). The Delica D:3 and Delica Van were discontinued in April 2019.

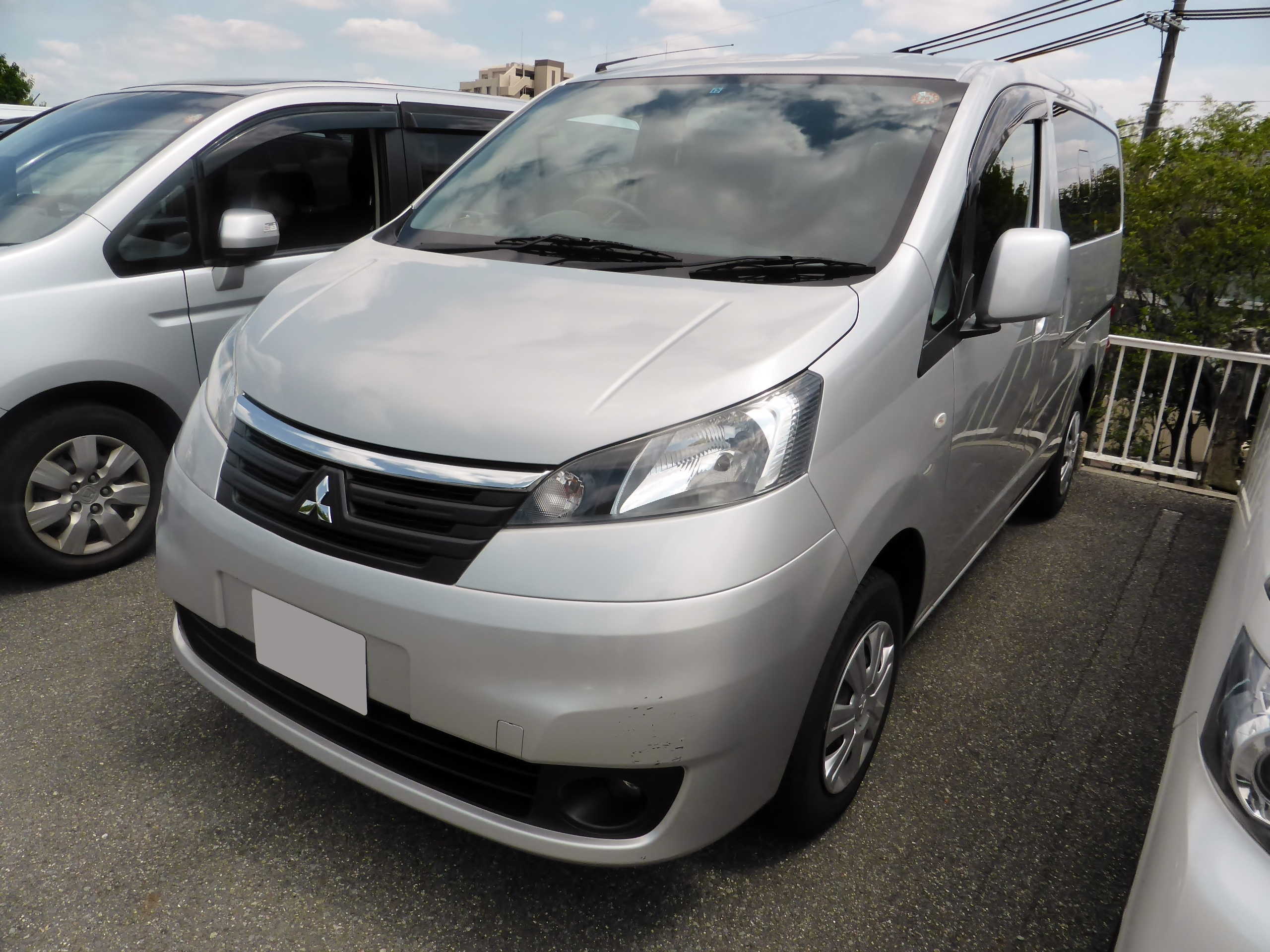
2011–2019 Mitsubishi Delica D:3

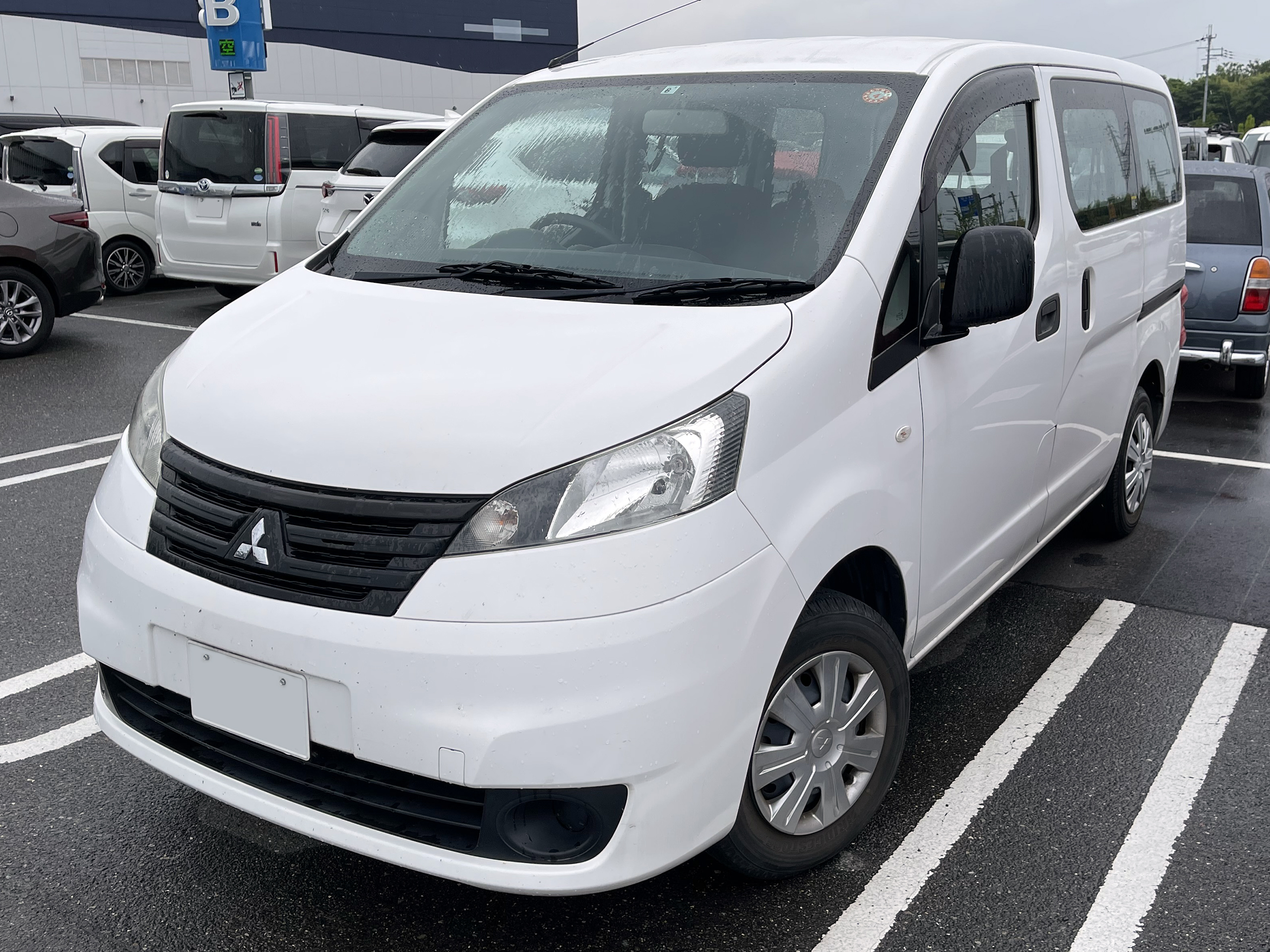
2011–2019 Mitsubishi Delica Van

=== Mitsubishi Delica D:2 (rebadged Suzuki Solio) ===
To complement the larger Delica D:5 minivan, a smaller Delica D:2 mini MPV appeared in March 2011. Equipped with a 1.2 L (1,242 cc) four-cylinder Suzuki K12B engine and a continuously variable transmission (CVT), it is a rebadged Suzuki Solio provided under an original equipment manufacturer deal.

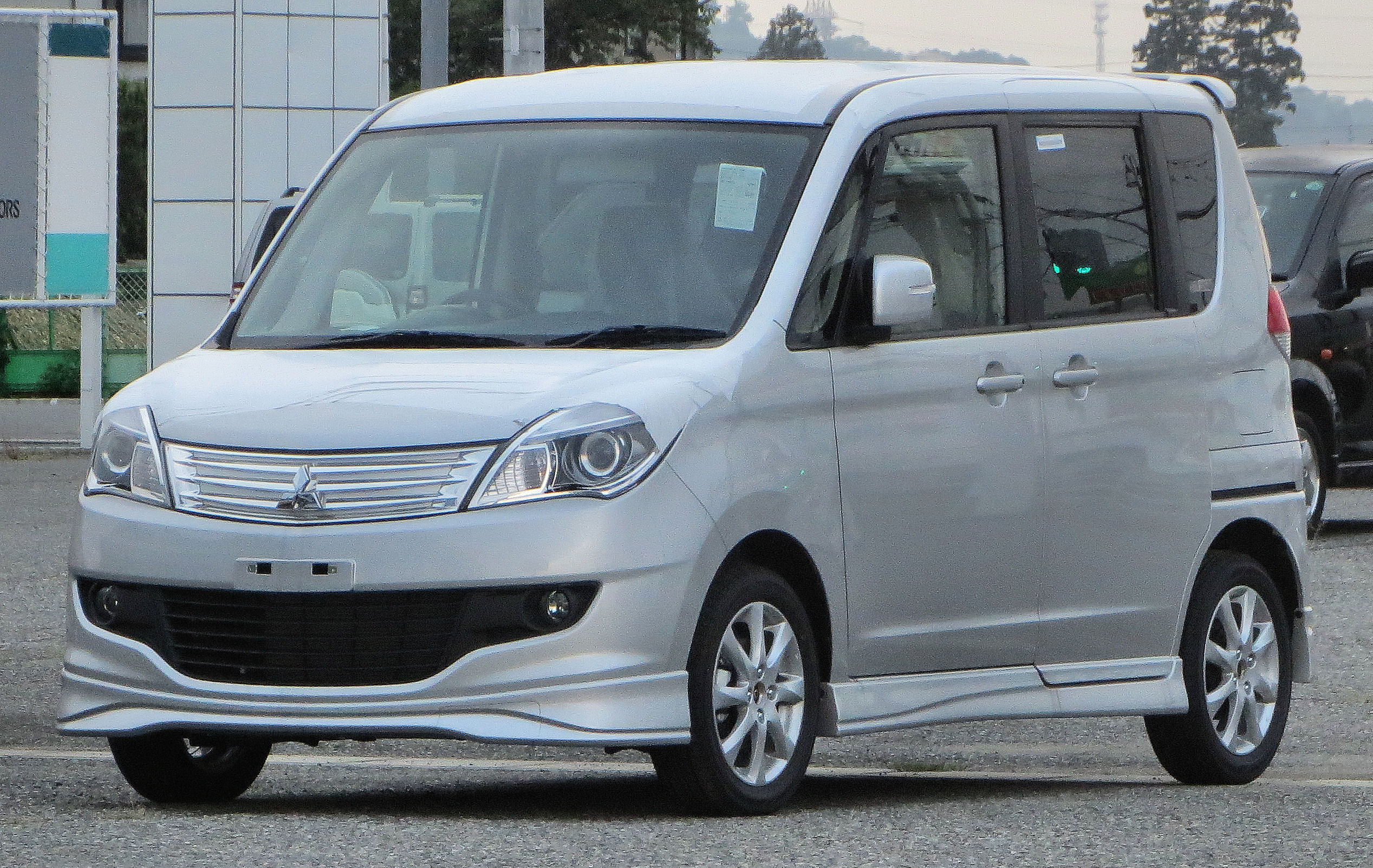
2011–2015 Mitsubishi Delica D:2 (first generation)

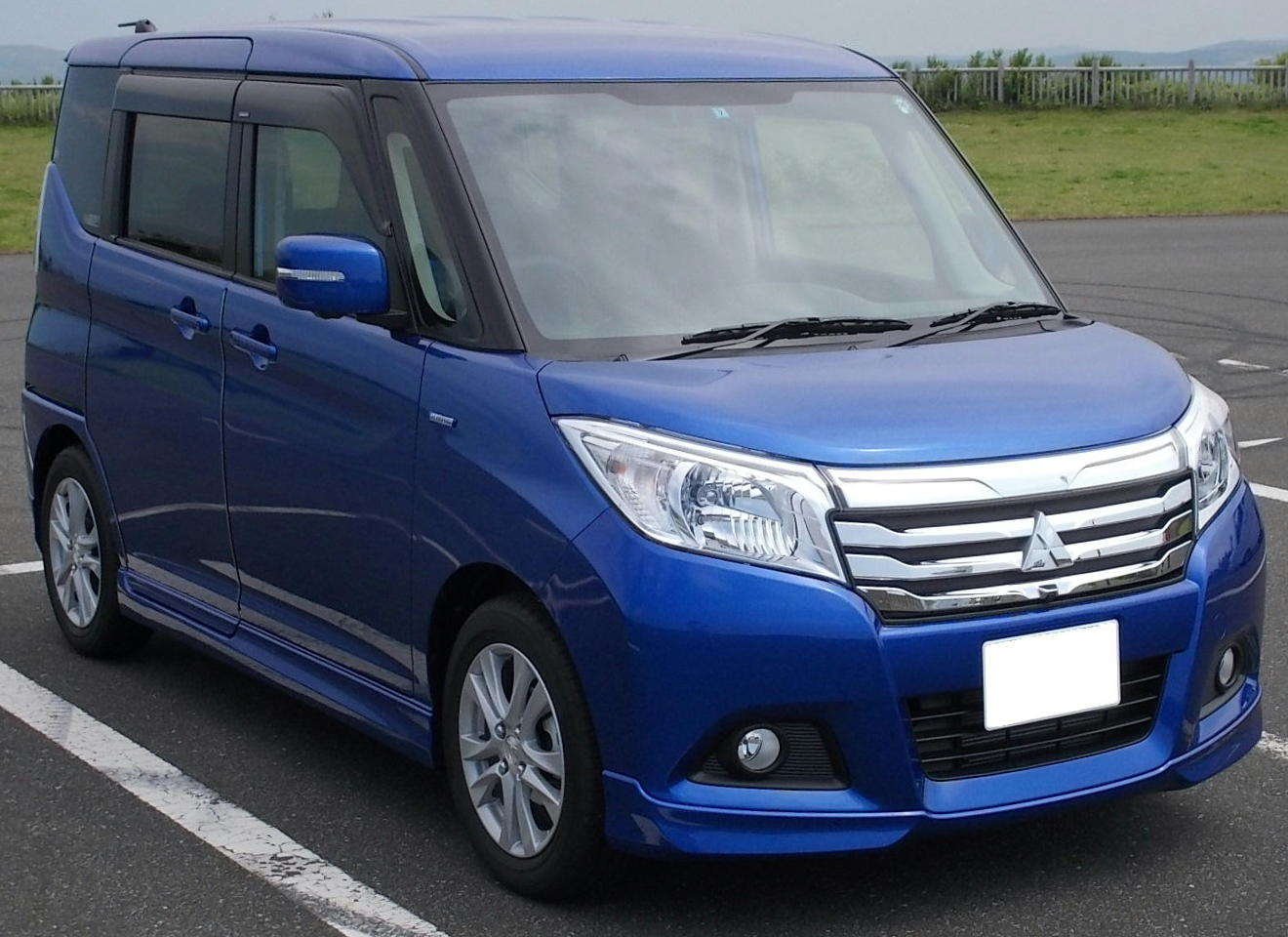
2015–2020 Mitsubishi Delica D:2 (second generation)

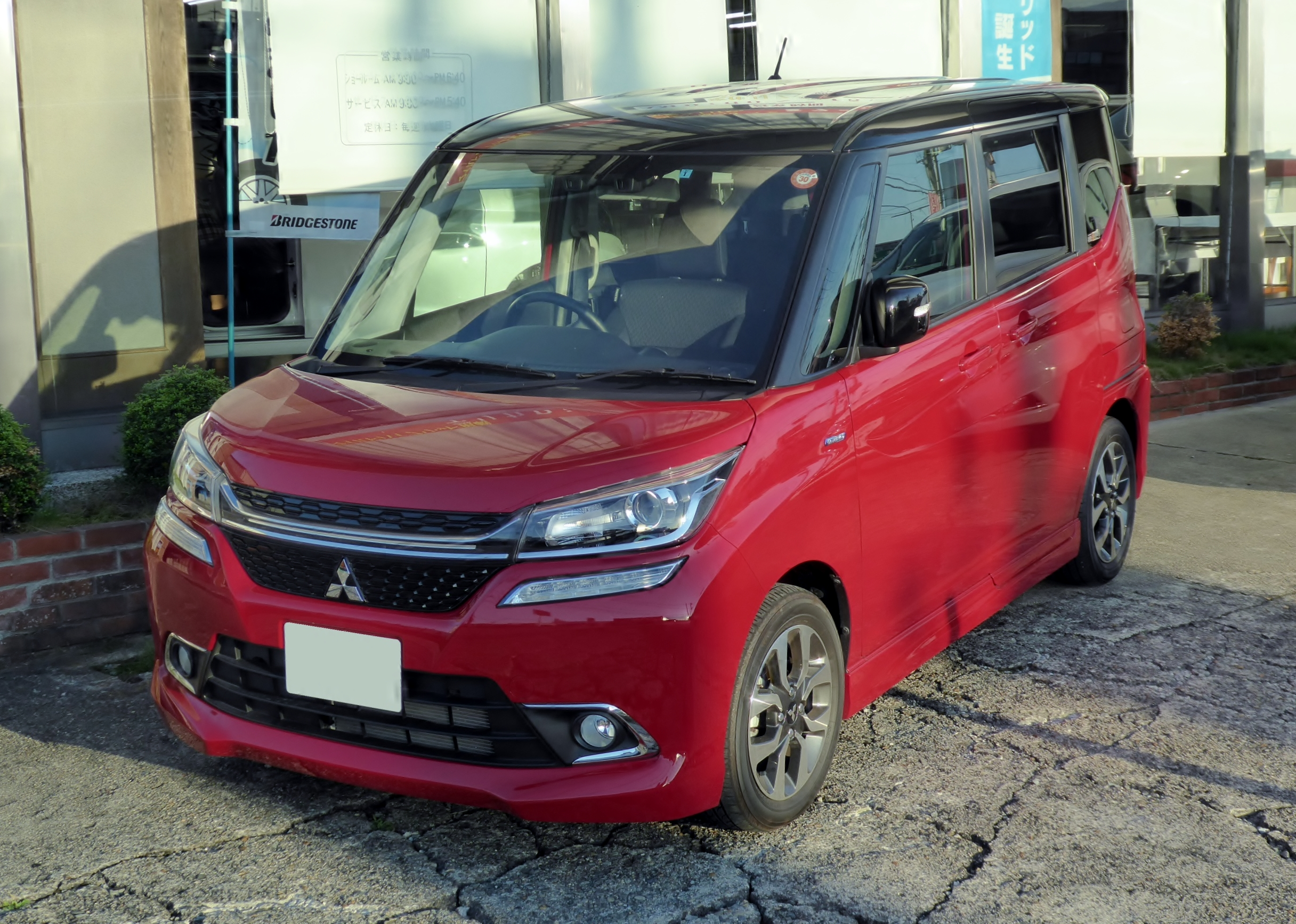
2015–2020 Mitsubishi Delica D:2 Custom (rebadged 2015 Suzuki Solio Bandit)

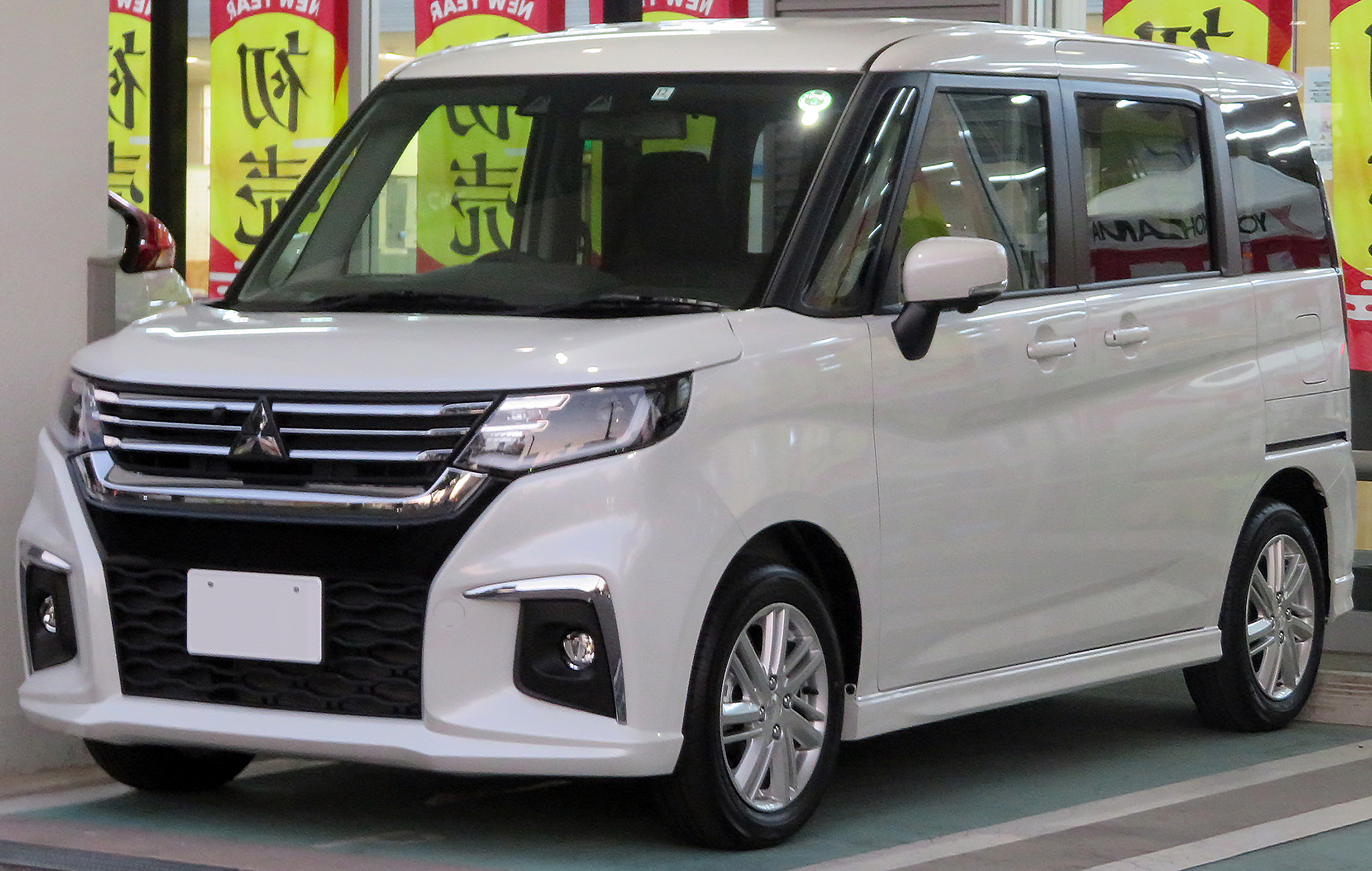
2021–present Mitsubishi Delica D:2 (third generation)

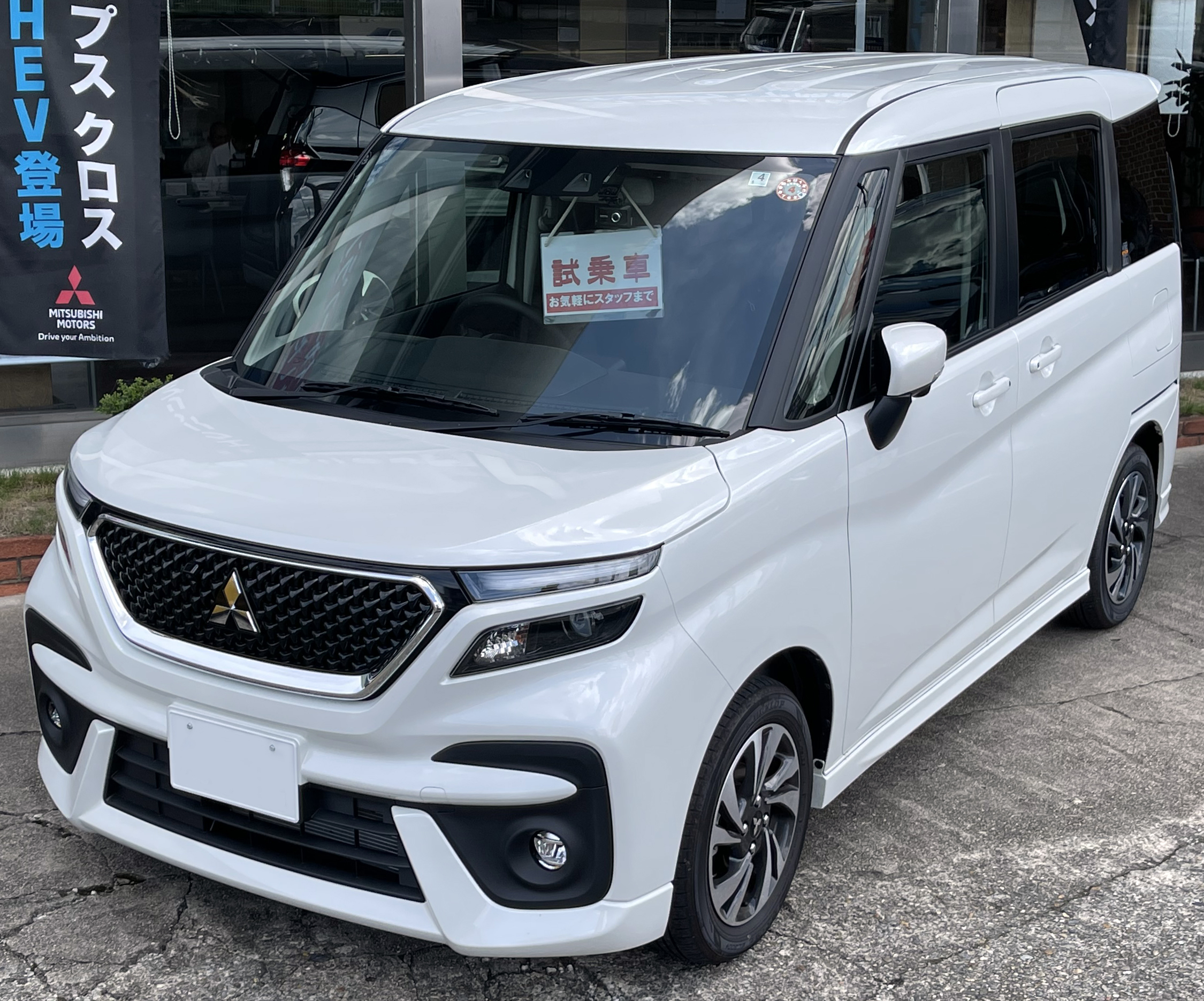
2021–present Mitsubishi Delica D:2 Custom (third generation) (rebadged 2021 Suzuki Solio Bandit)

=== Mitsubishi Delica Mini ===
The Delica Mini is a crossover-style kei variation of the Delica series. Replacing the eK X Space while still being based on it, it went on sale in May 2023. It was announced as a kei car that embodies the concept of the Delica, which combines the features of an SUV and a minivan.

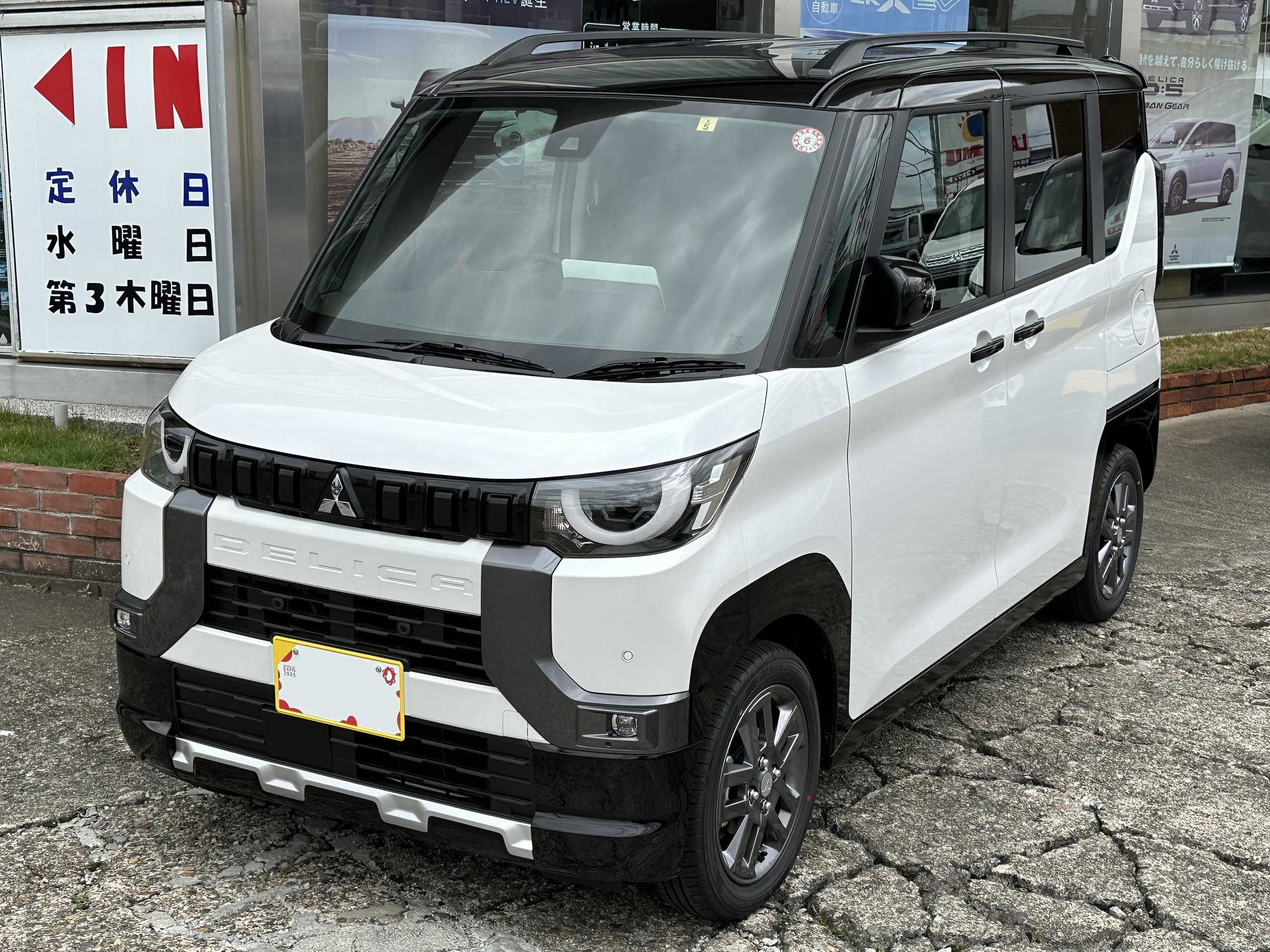
2023–2025 Mitsubishi Delica Mini (first generation)

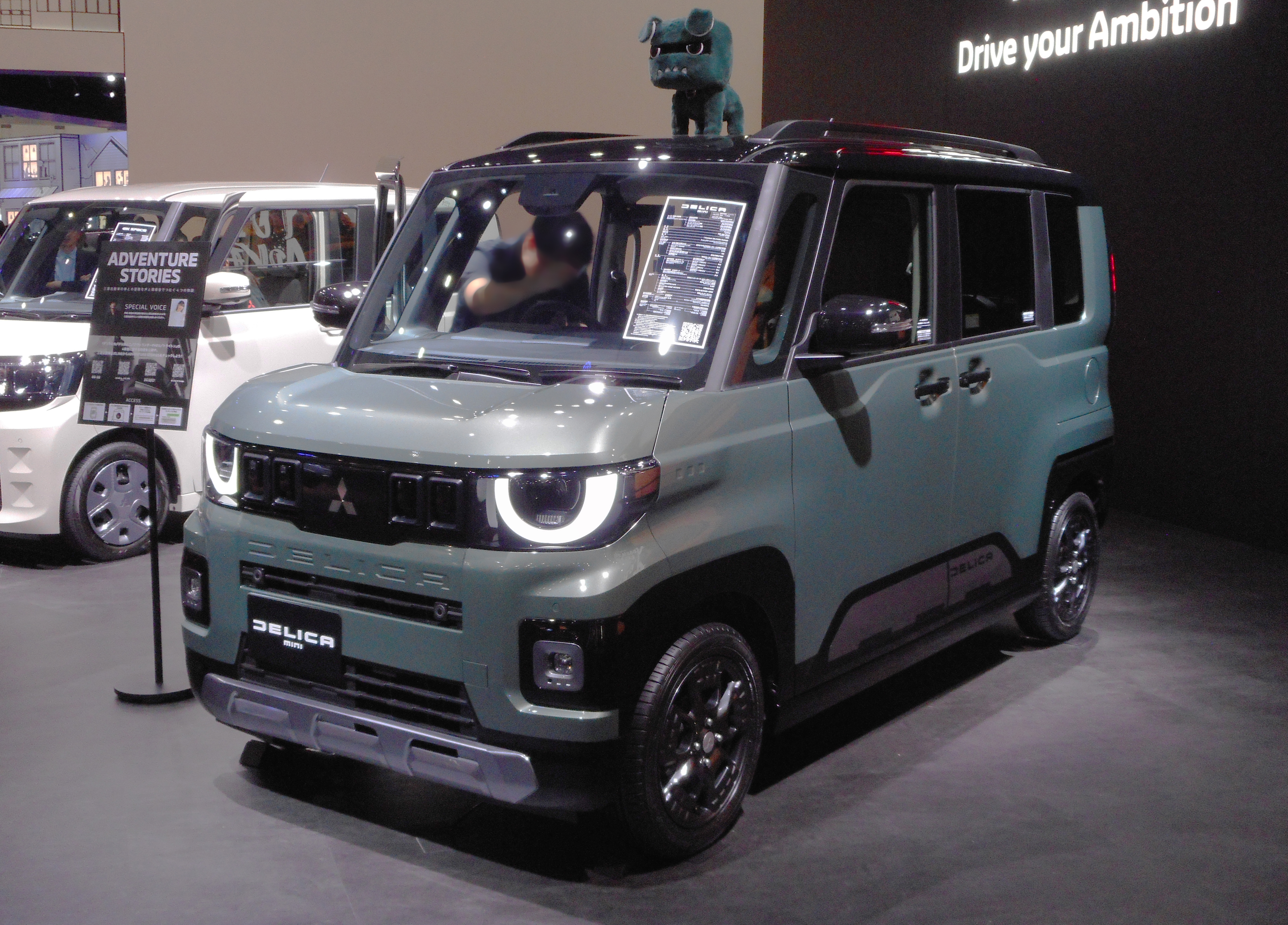
2025–present Mitsubishi Delica Mini (second generation)

== Production ==
Year	Japan	Philippines	Taiwan	China
1995	109,930	n/a	n/a	
1996	88,978	n/a	n/a	
1997	69,495	n/a	n/a	
1998	34,614	n/a	n/a	
1999	17,758	n/a	n/a	
2000	28,242	2,918	8,125	
2001	12,965	2,079	5,133	690
2002	17,456	2,925	4,192	600
2003	13,011	3,529	5,166	13,710
2004	16,432	2,826	3,862	16,074
2005	16,444	3,685	2,315	5,960
2006	16,041	3,992	1,160	–
2007	14,824	4,580	1,115	–

(Sources: Facts & Figures 2000, Facts & Figures 2005, Facts & Figures 2008, Facts & Figures 2010 Mitsubishi Motors website)

=== Indonesia (Colt L300) ===
Calendar Year	Indonesia
2012	27,652
2013	27,498
2014	
2015	
2016	20,058
2017	20,522
2018	21,895
2019	28,429
