= Kimura =

Kimura (written: 木村 or 木邑 lit. "tree village") is the 17th most common Japanese surname.

== Notable people with the surname ==
- Kimura Akebono (木村 曙; 1872–1890), Japanese novelist
- Arawa Kimura (木村 現; 1931–2007), Japanese footballer
- Arika Kimura (木村 有香; 1900–1996), Japanese botanist
- Asami Kimura (木村 麻美), Japanese idol and singer
- Atsushi Kimura (木村 敦志; born 1984), Japanese footballer
- Ayaka Kimura (木村 絢香; born 1981), Japanese singer
- Ayaka Kimura (voice actress) (木村 あやか; born 1978), also known as Yuka Inokuchi, Japanese voice actress
- Ayako Kimura (木村 文子; born 1988), Japanese hurdler
- Ben Kimura (artist) (木村 べん; 1947–2003), Japanese erotic artist
- Ben Kimura (politician) (木村 勉; born 1939), Japanese politician
- Bunji Kimura (木村 文治; born 1944), Japanese footballer and manager
- Bunzo Kimura (木村 文三; born 1942), Japanese rower
- Kimura Buzan (木村 武山; 1876–1942), Japanese painter
- Chie Kimura (木村 千恵; born 1980), Japanese field hockey player
- Daisaku Kimura (木村 大作; born 1939), Japanese film director and cinematographer
- Darren Kimura (born 1974), American businessman
- Doreen Kimura (1933–2013), Canadian psychologist
- Dustin Kimura (born 1989), American mixed martial artist
- Eri Kimura (木村 衣里; born 1973), Japanese swimmer
- Eriko Kimura (木村 絵理子; born 1961), Japanese audio director
- Fumikazu Kimura (木村 文紀; born 1988), Japanese baseball player
- Fumino Kimura (木村 文乃; born 1987), Japanese actress
- Hana Kimura (木村 花; 1997–2020), Japanese professional wrestler
- Heitarō Kimura (木村 兵太郎; 1888–1948), Japanese general
- Hidefumi Kimura (きむら ひでふみ; born 1965), Japanese writer, artist and animator
- Hiroshi Kimura (木村 宏; born 1954), Japanese businessman
- Hiroyuki Kimura (木村 浩之; born 1965), Japanese video game designer
- Hisashi Kimura (木村 栄; 1870–1943), Japanese astronomer
- Hitoshi Kimura (木村 仁; 1934–2023), Japanese politician
- Ihei Kimura (木村 伊兵衛; 1901–1974), Japanese photographer
- Isao Kimura (木村 功; 1923–1981), Japanese actor
- Izumi Kimura (born 1973), Japanese classical pianist
- Jiroemon Kimura (木村 次郎右衛門; 1897–2013), Japanese supercentenarian
- Jon Kimura Parker (born 1959), Canadian pianist
- Juri Kimura (木村 珠莉), Japanese voice actress
- Jutaro Kimura (木村 重太郎; born 1968), Japanese baseball player
- Kaela Kimura (木村 カエラ; born 1984), Japanese singer
- Kan Kimura (木村 幹; born 1966), Japanese political scientist
- Kazuaki Kimura (木村 一信; 1946–2015), Japanese scientist
- Kazuki Kimura (木村 一基; born 1973), Japanese shogi player
- Kazuo Kimura (木村 一夫; 1909–?), Japanese high jumper
- Kazushi Kimura (木村 和司; born 1958), Japanese footballer and manager
- Keichi Kimura (1914–1988), American painter and illustrator
- Keiichi Kimura (photographer) (木村 恵一; born 1935), Japanese photographer
- Keiichi Kimura (swimmer) (木村 敬一; born 1990), Japanese Paralympic swimmer
- Kengo Kimura (木村 健悟; born 1953), Japanese professional wrestler
- Ken-ichi Kimura (architect) (木村 建一; born 1933), Japanese architect
- Kenichi Kimura (rugby union) (木村 賢一; born 1968), Japanese rugby union player
- Kenji Kimura (木村 憲治; born 1945), Japanese volleyball player
- Kimura Kenkadō (木村 蒹葭堂; 1736–1802), Japanese scholar, artist and art connoisseur
- Kiminobu Kimura (木村 公宣; born 1970), Japanese alpine skier
- Kira Kimura (木村 綺羅; born 2004), Japanese snowboarder
- Kiyoshi Kimura (木村 清), Japanese businessman
- Koichiro Kimura (木村 浩一郎; 1969–2014), Japanese mixed martial artist
- Koji Kimura (木村 興治; born 1940), Japanese table tennis player
- Kokichi Kimura (木村 浩吉; born 1961), Japanese footballer and manager
- Komako Kimura (木村 駒子; 1887–1980), Japanese suffragist, actress, dancer, theatre manager and magazine editor
- Kosuke Kimura (木村 光佑; born 1984), Japanese footballer
- Kozaemon Kimura (木村小左衛門; 1888–1952), Japanese businessman and politician
- Kyoko Kimura (木村 響子; born 1977), Japanese professional wrestler and mixed martial artist
- Larry Kimura, American linguist
- Madoka Kimura (木村 まどか; born 1980), Japanese voice actress and singer
- Makoto Kimura (木村 誠; born 1979), Japanese footballer
- Mamoru Kimura (木村 守; born 1981), better known as Kimurayama Mamoru, Japanese sumo wrestler
- Mari Kimura (木村 まり; born 1962), Japanese classical violinist and composer
- Masaaki Kimura (木村 政昭; born 1940), Japanese academic
- Masafumi Kimura (木村 雅史; born 1976), Japanese voice actor
- Masahiko Kimura (木村 政彦; 1917–1993), Japanese judoka and professional wrestler
- Masahiko Kimura (bonsai artist) (木村 正彦; born 1940), Japanese bonsai artist
- Masahiko Kimura (footballer) (木村 允彦; born 1984), Japanese footballer
- Masanobu Kimura (木村 政信; born 1960), Japanese golfer
- Masatake Kimura (木村 昌丈; born 1990), Japanese handball player
- Masatomi Kimura (木村 昌福; 1891–1960), Imperial Japanese Navy admiral
- Masaya Kimura (木村 正哉; born 1986), Japanese cross-country skier
- Masaya Kimura (木村 柾哉; born 1997), Japanese singer, dancer and actor. Member of the Japanese boy group INI.
- Meru Kimura (木村 メル; born 2001), Indonesian footballer
- Mineshi Kimura (木村 峰士), Japanese video game designer
- Minori Kimura (樹村 みのり; born 1949), Japanese manga artist
- Minoru Kimura (born 1993), Brazilian kickboxer
- Mitsunori Kimura (木村 充伯; born 1983), Japanese artist
- Mitsuru Kimura (木村 満; born 1970), Japanese rower
- Mona Kimura (木村 萌那; born 2001), Japanese kickboxer and former amateur boxer
- Motoo Kimura (木村 資生; 1924–1994), Japanese biologist and theoretical population geneticist
- Nozomi Kimura (木村 のぞみ; born 1997), Japanese footballer
- Rie Kimura (木村 理恵; born 1971), Japanese women's footballer
- Rusher Kimura (ラッシャー木村; 1941–2010), Japanese professional wrestler
- Ryo Kimura (木村 了; born 1988), Japanese actor
- Ryōhei Kimura (木村 良平; born 1984), Japanese voice actor
- Ryuji Kimura (木村 龍治; born 1970), Japanese baseball player
- Ryunosuke Kimura (木村 龍之介; born 1983), Japanese theatre director
- Saeko Kimura (木村 さえこ; born 1963), Japanese synchronized swimmer
- Saori Kimura (木村 沙織; born 1986), Japanese volleyball player
- Seibei Kimura (木村 清兵衛; 1911–?), Japanese water polo player
- Seiji Kimura (木村 誠二; born 2001), Japanese footballer
- Kimura Shigekore (木村 重茲; died 1595), Japanese samurai
- Kimura Shigenari (木村 重成; 1593–1615), Japanese samurai
- Shinichiro Kimura (木村 真一郎), Japanese anime director
- Shintaro Kimura (木村 慎太郎; born 1987), Japanese sprinter
- Shinya Kimura, motorcycle builder
- Shioko Kimura, biochemist
- Shiroshichi Kimura (木村 四郎七; 1902–1996), Japanese diplomat
- Sho Kimura (木村 翔; born 1988), Japanese boxer
- Shogo Kimura (木村 昇吾; born 1980), Japanese baseball player and cricketer
- Shota Kimura (baseball) (木村 正太; born 1986), Japanese baseball player
- Shota Kimura (footballer) (木村 勝太; born 1988), Japanese footballer
- Shourai Kimura (木村 象雷; 1908–1986), Japanese swimmer and journalist
- Subaru Kimura (木村 昴; born 1990), Japanese actor, voice actor and singer
- Sueko Matsueda Kimura (1912–2001), American artist
- Susumu Kimura (木村 進; 1891–1980), Imperial Japanese Navy admiral
- Tae Kimura (木村 多江; born 1971), Japanese actress
- Takahide Kimura (木村 隆秀; born 1955), Japanese politician
- Takahiro Kimura (木村 貴宏; 1964–2023), Japanese animator, illustrator and character designer
- Takahiro Kimura (footballer) (木村 孝洋; born 1957), Japanese footballer and manager
- Takashi Kimura (water polo) (木村 隆; born 1950), Japanese water polo player
- Takehiro Kimura (木村 勇大; born 1992), Japanese Hino Red Dolphins rugby union player
- Takemune Kimura (木村 雄宗; 1931–2006), Japanese businessman
- Takeo Kimura (木村 威夫; 1918–2010), Japanese art director, writer and film director
- Takeshi Kimura (木村 武; 1912–1988), Japanese screenwriter
- Takeshi Kimura (racing driver) (木村 武史; born 1970), Japanese racing driver
- Takuya Kimura (木村 拓哉; born 1972), Japanese actor and singer
- Takuya Kimura (baseball) (木村 拓也; 1972–2010), Japanese baseball player
- Taky Kimura (1924–2021), American martial arts practitioner and instructor
- Tarō Kimura (journalist) (木村 太郎; born 1938), Japanese journalist
- Tarō Kimura (politician) (木村 太郎; 1965–2017), Japanese politician
- Tatsuya Kimura (木村 立哉; born 1964), Japanese film producer, critic and music producer
- Tetsumasa Kimura (木村 哲昌; born 1972), Japanese footballer
- Tomoka Kimura (木村 友香; born 1994), Japanese long-distance runner
- Toshio Kimura (木村 俊夫; 1909–1983), Japanese politician
- Toshitaka Kimura (木村 敏隆; born 1963), Japanese rugby union player
- Toyoko Kimura (木村 トヨ子; born 1946), Japanese swimmer
- Tsunehisa Kimura (木村 恒久; 1928–2008), Japanese artist
- Tsutomu Kimura (木村 勉; born 1935), Japanese owner of the restaurant Tenkaippin
- Umejiro Kimura (1869–1927), Japanese philatelist
- Yasuko Kimura (木村 安子; born 1937), Japanese long jumper
- Yojiro Kimura (木村 陽二郎; 1912–2006), Japanese botanist
- Yoshino Kimura (木村 佳乃; born 1976), Japanese actress, voice actress and singer
- Yoshio Kimura (politician) (木村 義雄; born 1948), Japanese politician
- Yoshio Kimura (shogi) (木村 義雄; 1905–1986), Japanese shogi player
- Youmi Kimura (木村 弓), Japanese singer and musician
- Yu Kimura (boxer) (木村 悠; born 1983), Japanese boxer
- Yu Kimura (footballer) (木村 裕; born 1994), Japanese footballer
- Yudai Kimura (木村 勇大; born 2001), Japanese footballer
- Yuji Kimura (木村 祐志; born 1987), Japanese footballer
- Yuki Kimura (木村 有希; born 1996), better known as Yukipoyo, Japanese model and television personality
- Yuta Kimura (木村 優太; born 1985), Japanese baseball player

== Fictional characters ==
- Kimura (character), a character in Marvel Comics
- Kimura (木村), a character in the manga series Azumanga Daioh
- Kimura, a character in the manga series Shōnen to Inu
- Kaere Kimura (木村 カエレ), a character in the manga series Sayonara Zetsubō Sensei
- Katsu Kimura, an arms dealer in the animated film Spies in Disguise
- Koichi Kimura (木村 輝一), a character in the anime Digimon Frontier
- Masayoshi (Justice) Kimura (木村 正義 (ジャスティス)), a character in the manga series Assassination Classroom
- Seiko Kimura (忌村 静子), a character in the anime series Danganronpa 3: The End of Hope's Peak High School
- Shunji Kimura, a character in the television series Bridal Mask
- Tatsuya Kimura (木村 達也), a character in the manga series Hajime no Ippo
- Yui Kimura, a character in the 2016 online multiplayer horror game Dead by Daylight

== See also ==
- Kimura spider, a spider named after its discoverer, Arika Kimura
- Kimura lock, a type of armlock named after Masahiko Kimura
