= Mitsunori =

- Gender: Male

Origin
- Origin: Japanese
- Meaning: Different meanings depending on the kanji used

Mitsunori (written: 光教, 光則, 光紀, 光範, 充伯 or 充功) is a masculine Japanese given name. Notable people with the name include:

- Mitsunori Fujiguchi (藤口 光紀; born 1949), Japanese footballer
- Mitsunori Kimura (木村 充伯; born 1983), Japanese artist
- Mitsunori Makino (牧野 光則; born 1988), Japanese shogi player
- Mitsunori Miki (三木 光範; born 1950), Japanese computer scientist
- Mitsunori Okamoto (岡本 充功; born 1971), Japanese politician
- Mitsunori Yabuta (藪田 光教; born 1976), Japanese footballer
- Mitsunori Yamao (山尾 光則; born 1973), Japanese footballer
- Mitsunori Yoshida (吉田 光範; born 1962), Japanese footballer

== See also ==
- Mitsunari
