= Kenichi Kimura =

Kenichi Kimura may refer to:

- Ken-ichi Kimura (architect) (木村 建一, born 1933), Japanese architect
- Kenichi Kimura (rugby union) (木村 賢一, born 1968), Japanese rugby union player
