= Katsuhiko Kawasoe =

President and Chief Executive Officer of Mitsubishi Motors

Katsuhiko Kawasoe (河添 克彦, Kawasoe Katsuhiko; born September 29, 1936) is a former President and Chief Executive Officer of Mitsubishi Motors.

After working in the Accounting, Personnel Planning, and Labor Relations departments, he was appointed Executive Vice President of Mitsubishi Motor Manufacturing of America, General Manager of the Nagoya production plant, and General Manager of the Office of Passenger Car Production. He was appointed to the board of Mitsubishi Motors in 1995, and became President on November 27, 1997 following the resignation of his predecessor Takemune Kimura, who was forced to step down after admitting involvement in a racketeering scandal. At the time the company was suffering the effects of the East Asian financial crisis, and Kawasoe's first year in charge would be marked by a ¥25.7 billion net loss and the suspension of dividend payments to shareholders. In response, Kawasoe proposed a recovery strategy of staff cuts, rationalisation of car platforms, and the closure of plants in Thailand and New Zealand. However, the plan was only partially successful, and following another year without dividend payments in 1999, Mitsubishi was forced to seek external support when it sold a controlling 34 percent stake to DaimlerChrysler for €2.1 billion on March 27, 2000.

In June 2000, Kawasoe was forced to admit that Mitsubishi Motors and its Fuso Truck and Bus subsidiary had systematically covered up reports of vehicle defects from the Japanese Transport Ministry since 1977. The effect on the company's stock was immediate and precipitous, falling 13 percent on the news. As further revelations of "one of the largest corporate scandals in Japanese history" emerged over the summer the stock continued to plummet until Kawasoe was forced to resign on November 1, 2000. For his final month he took a 40 percent pay cut, along with dozens of other executives who suffered similar punishments.

Kawasoe's involvement in Mitsubishi's troubles was not to end after his resignation. Following two fatal accidents involving Fuso trucks in 2002 and 2004, he and five other former executives were arrested by police investigating the deaths and subsequently charged with professional negligence. He, along with the other executives, was convicted and received a suspended sentence.
