= Silent Siren =

Japanese rock/pop band

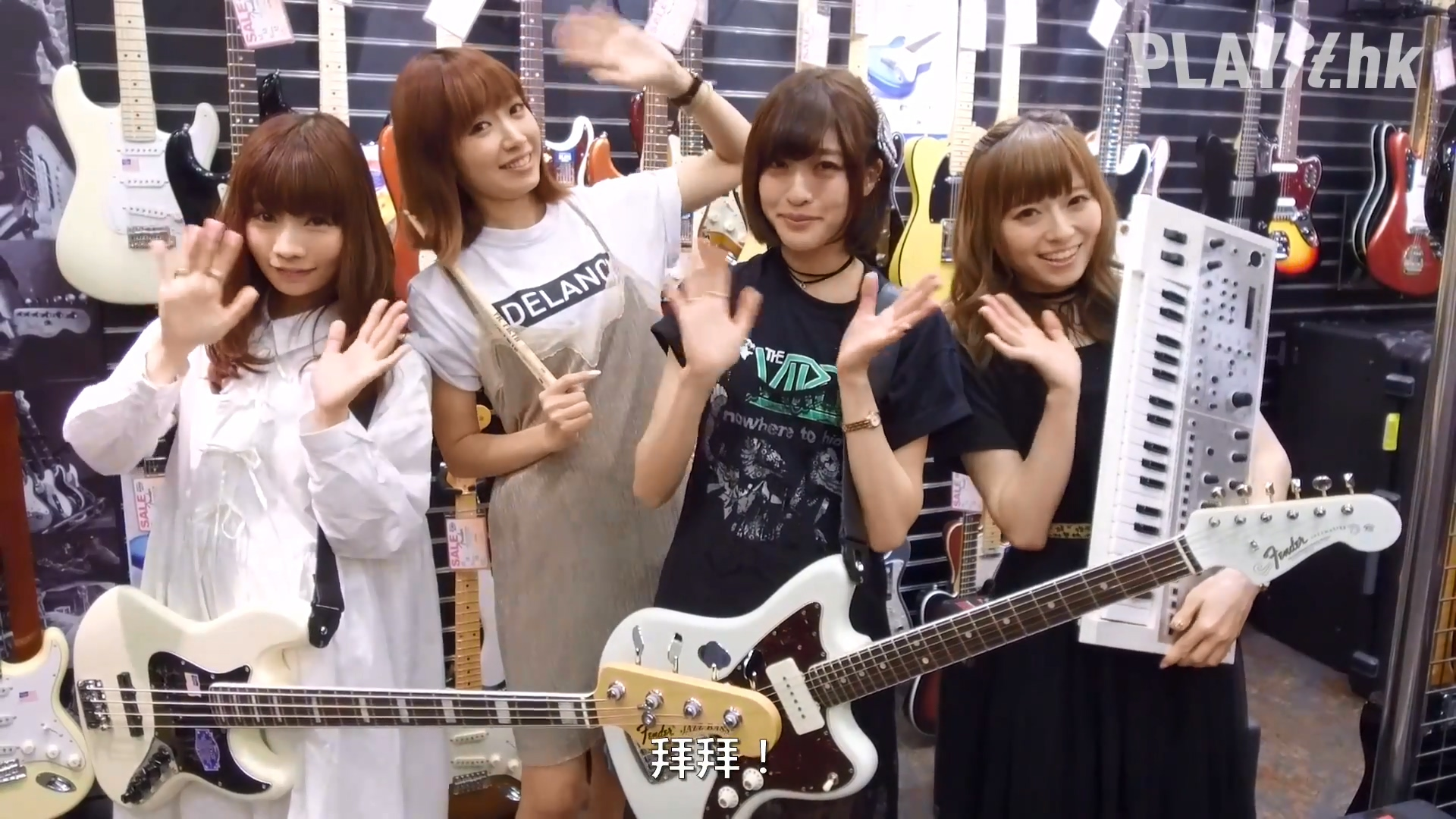
- Silent Siren in 2016

Background information
- Origin: Japan
- Genres: Rock, J-pop
- Years active: 2010–2021, 2023–present
- Labels: Brand-New Music; Dreamusic; Universal Music Japan; Youthful Tune
- Members: Sumire Yoshida; Aina Yamauchi; Yukako Kurosaka
- Past members: Ayana Sōgawa; Hinako Umemura
- Website: silent-siren.com

Silent Siren (サイレントサイレン, Sairento Sairen; stylized as SILENT SIREN) is a Japanese all-female band formed in 2010 and associated with Platinum Production. The members consist of three fashion models: Sumire Yoshida (lead vocals and guitar), Aina Yamauchi (bass guitar), and Yukako Kurosaka (keyboard). Ayana Sōgawa was originally the group's keyboardist until she left in 2012.

Silent Siren first released two independent extended plays, Sai Sai and Love Shiru, in 2012. After getting signed to Dreamusic, the group made their major label debut with "Sweet Pop!"

== History ==
=== 2010–2012: Indies era, Sai Sai, and Love Shiru ===
Silent Siren was formed in 2010, with amateur fashion models Sumire Yoshida as lead vocals and guitar, Hinako Umemura on drums, Aina Yamauchi on bass guitar, and Ayana Sogawa on keyboard. Yoshida and Umemura, who both appeared in the fashion magazine Cutie, co-founded the band and invited Yamauchi, who appeared in aomoji-kei magazines, and Vivi model Sogawa to join. Silent Siren released their debut mini album, Sai Sai, on February 8, 2012, with the song "All Right ('Ima' o Kakeru)" used as the official support song for Agestock 2011, the largest college student event in Japan. They followed up with their second mini album, Love Shiru, on July 4, 2012.

=== 2012–2014: Major label debut, Start, and 31 Wonderland ===
After the release of Love Shiru, Sogawa departed from the group. In August 2012, Yamauchi recommended her friend, Yukako Kurosaka, as a replacement. Kurosaka, who appeared in the magazine Ray as an amateur model and a Wednesday panelist on the variety show Zip!, was announced as a member during a live show on September 13, 2012. To promote their major label debut, the CD single "Want Chu" was released as a magazine gift with the November 2012 issue of Cutie.

Silent Siren released their first single, "Sweet Pop!", on November 14, 2012, which was featured as the ending theme song to the television program Tokyo Brand New Girls. "Stella" was released as their second single on February 20, 2013, and was featured as the ending theme song to the television program Happy Music.

=== 2015–2016: Silent Siren, and S ===
In January 2015, Silent Siren performed their first solo concert at Nippon Budokan, which was the fastest any all-female band had performed at the prestigious venue following a major-label debut. That same year, the band created theme songs for the anime series Onyankopon and Shinkansen Henkei Robo Shinkalion, the live-action film of Anohana, and the Japanese restaurant chain Tenkaippin.

In March 2016, the band released their fourth album S, which reached 3rd place in the Oricon weekly ranking. On December 30, 2016, at the Silent Siren 2016 End of 2016 Special Live Dream on! held at the Tokyo Metropolitan Gymnasium, the band announced they were changing the stylization of their name to all capitals and were moving from Dolly Music to EMI Records.

=== 2017–2018: Girls Power ===
In March 2017, Silent Siren released their 12th single "Fujiyama Disco" and the band's first best album Silent Siren Selection. In May, they released their 13th single "Akane/ Awaawa", and their 14th single "Just Meet" in October. In December, they released their 5th album Girls Power.

In March 2018, they released the single "Tenkaippin no Theme". In July 2018, they released their 15th single "19 summer note". In November 2018, they released their 16th single "Go Way!".

=== 2019–2020: 31313 ===
In March 2019, the band released their 6th album 31313, followed by the digital single "Shigatsu no Kaze (四月の風; April Wind)" in April. In December, they released the EP Hero.

In April 2020, Silent Siren launched an official YouTube channel to commemorate their 10th anniversary.

=== 2020–2021: Mix10th and Silent Siren Year-end Special live tour 2021 ===
On June 18, 2020, Poppin'Party of Aimi collaboration song with " . Up To You feat Aimi from Poppin'Party " is distributed released the next day music video has been published.

On September 2, 2020, Released the 7th album mix10th.

On September 23, 2020, It was announced that member Hinako (Hinako Umemura) will be the first voice actor to play the role of D4DJ 's "Takao Toka".

On May 4, 2021, Aina Yamauchi announces new coronavirus infection.

On August 25, 2021, Yukako Kurosaka announces new coronavirus infection.

On September 25, 2021, Hinako Umemura leaves the band with "Kirara Revenge ~ Saisai 10 Years Old Festival ~".

On October 22, 2021, Announced that the activity will be suspended within the year.

On December 30, 2021, "SILENT SIREN Year-end Special LIVE TOUR 2021" FAMILIA "" will be suspended due to the final performance of the Tokyo Metropolitan Gymnasium .

=== 2023–present: End of hiatus, return to live tour and More Than Pink ===
On October 11, 2023, The band released an important update via social media informing the public that the 3 remaining members would be resuming the band's activities, starting with a live concert to be hosted at "Countdown Japan 23/24" on December 28, 2023. The band announced they will be touring with a support drummer going forward.

On January 31, 2024, The band established their own independent label, YOUTH FUL TUNE, and began distributing their first new song since their resumption of activities, "Sus4" . On March 19, the music video for the song was released on their official YouTube channel . On March 27, a special program to commemorate the release of the mini album, "SILENT SIREN Members Appear Live! New Album "YOUTHFUL" Release Commemorative Special Program" was broadcast on Nico Nico Live Broadcast. On March 31, the group released their third mini album, "YOUTHFUL ".

== Members ==
All members use both their birthnames and professional nicknames in media.

Current members

- Suu (すぅ) (Sumire Yoshida (吉田 菫)) – lead vocals, guitar (2010–2021, 2023–present)
- Ainyan (あいにゃん) (Aina Yamauchi (山内 あいな)) – bass, backing vocals (2010–2021, 2023–present)
- Yukarun (ゆかるん) (Yukako Kurosaka (黒坂 優香子)) – keyboard, backing vocals (2012–2021, 2023–present)

Former members

- Yana (Ayana Sōgawa (寒川 綾奈)) – keyboard, backing vocals (2010–2012)
- Hinanchu (ひなんちゅ) (Hinako Umemura (梅村 妃奈子) – drums, backing vocals (2010–2021)

=== Backing band ===
- Naoki Kubo (クボ ナオキ) – backing guitar (2012–2021, 2023–present)
- Michie (みっちー) – backing guitar (2012–2015)
- Ai Kishinami (岸波藍) – drums (2023–present)
- Nanako Banda (番田 渚奈子) – drums (2023–present)
- Sara Ohtsu (番田 渚奈子) – keyboards (2026)

== Discography ==
Silent Siren discography
- Studio albums: 7
- Compilation albums: 3
- Singles: 18
- Video albums: 8
- Mini albums: 2

=== Studio albums ===
List of studio albums, with selected details and chart positions
Title	Album details	Peak chart positions
Title	Album details	JPN Oricon
Start	Released: April 10, 2013; Label: Dreamusic; Formats: CD, digital download; Track listing: 1. "Start"; 2. "→"; 3. "Sweet Pop!"; 4. "Urara"; 5. "Yume Oi" (ユメオイ); 6. "Ne-e" (ねぇ); 7. "Remember"; 8. "Want Chu"; 9. "Zutto..." (ずっと...); 10. "Soda"; 11. "Stella"; 12. "Amakusa" (甘草)	16
31 Wonderland	Released: February 12, 2014; Label: Dreamusic; Formats: CD, digital download; Track listing: 1. "31 Entrance"; 2. "Ring Ring Ring"; 3. "Bii-San" (ビーサン); 4. "Are You Ready?"; 5. "Love Fighter!"; 6. "Antimony" (アンチノミー); 7. "Delay"; 8. "I × U"; 9. "Limited"; 10. "Milestone" (マイルストーン); 11. "Ame Furi Furiru" (雨降りフリル); 12. "Guru Guru Wonderland" (ぐるぐるワンダーランド)	4
Silent Siren (サイレントサイレン)	Released: February 25, 2015; Label: Dreamusic; Formats: CD, digital download; Track listing: 1. "Muon no Keikoku" (無音の警告); 2. "Kakumei"; 3. "Bang! Bang! Bang!"; 4. "Routine"; 5. "Soukai Rock" (爽快ロック); 6. "Tewotsunaide" (手をつないで); 7. "Lucky Girl" (ラッキーガール); 8. "DanceMusiQ"; 9. "Limited"; 10. "Koi Yuki" (恋い雪); 11. "Jyoshikou Sensou" (女子校戦争); 12. "Aimai Me Mine" (曖昧 me mine); 13. "Strawberry Moon" (ストロベリームーン)	7
S	Released: March 2, 2016; Label: Dreamusic; Formats: CD, digital download; Track listing: 1. "Cherry Bomb" (チェリボム); 2. "Hachigatsu no Yoru" (八月の夜); 3. "Milk Boy"; 4. "Hapi-Mari" (ハピマリ); 5. "Love Install"; 6. "Hikari"; 7. "Yoshida-san" (吉田さん); 8. "DanceMusiQ"; 9. "Layla" (レイラ); 10. "Alarm"; 11. "Nukumor"; 12. "C.A.F.E."; 13. "Slow Morning"; 14. "Secret Base - Kimiga Kuretamono" (secret base ～君がくれたもの～)	3
Girls Power	Released: December 27, 2017; Label: Universal Music Japan; Formats: CD, digital download; Track listing: 1. "Fujiyama Disco" (フジヤマディスコ); 2. "Merry-Go-Round"; 3. "Knife"; 4. "Love Balloon"; 5. "Papayapayapa" (パパヤパヤパ); 6. "Just Meet" (ジャストミート); 7. "Akane"; 8. "Fuyumegu" (フユメグ); 9. "Sakurasaku Aoiharu" (さくら咲く青い春); 10. "Kaleidoscope"; 11. "Odore Motion"; 12. "Sayonara Hibiya" (さよなら日比谷)	6
31313	Released: March 13, 2019; Label: Universal Music Japan; Formats: CD, digital download; Track listing: 1. "Koino Esper" (恋のエスパー); 2. "Mujuuryoku Dance" (無重力ダンス); 3. "Go Way!"; 4. "ALC.Monster"; 5. "Tenkaippino Theme" (天下一品のテーマ); 6. "Cream Soda" (クリームソーダ); 7. "Reborn"; 8. "Sotsugyou" (卒業); 9. "19 Summer Note"; 10. "Attack"; 11. "Kawakanai Namida" (渇かない涙); 12. "Letter"; 13. "Happy Song For You"	7
Mix10th	Released: September 2, 2020; Label: Universal Music Japan; Formats: CD, digital download; Track listing: 1. "Hero"; 2. "Sun Moon"; 3. "Up to You"; 4. "Kikasete Wow Wow Wo" (聞かせてwow wowを); 5. "Mate"; 6. "4gatsuno kaze" (四月の風); 7. "Tenohira" (てのひら); 8. "Over Drive"; 9. "She"; 10. "Sekai de Ichiban Bukiyou na Love Song" (世界で一番不器用なラブソング); 11. "Connect"; 12. "Cheer Up!"; 13. "Answer"	9
Triangle	Released: April 15, 2026; Label: Youthful Tune; Formats: CD, digital download	29

=== Mini albums ===
List of mini albums, with selected details and chart positions
Title	Album details	Peak chart positions
Title	Album details	JPN Oricon
Sai Sai (サイサイ)	Released: February 8, 2012; Label: Brand-New Music; Formats: CD; Track listing: 1. "Lingerie" (ランジェリー); 2. "Ren'ai" (恋哀); 3. "Kimi wa Tenki" (キミハテンキ); 4. "Chiranai Hana" (チラナイハナ); 5. "Sepia" (セピア); 6. "Siren" (サイレン); 7. "All Right ('Ima' o Kakeru)" (All Right～“今”を懸ける～)	179
Love Shiru (ラブシル)	Released: July 4, 2012; Label: Brand-New Music; Formats: CD; Track listing: 1. "Love no Shirushi" (LOVEのしるし); 2. "Evening Star" (イブニングスター); 3. "Milky Way"; 4. "Hatsukoi Kinenbi" (初恋記念日); 5. "Escape"; 6. "Goodbye3"; 7. "Kimi ga Suki" (キミがスキ)	193
Youthful	Released: March 31, 2024; Label: Youthful Tune; Formats: CD	15
More Than Pink	Released: January 15, 2025; Label: Youthful Tune; Formats: CD	21

=== Compilation albums ===
List of compilation albums, with selected details and chart positions
Title	Album details	Peak chart positions
Title	Album details	JPN Oricon
Silent Siren Selection	Released: March 1, 2017; Label: Dreamusic; Formats: CD, digital download; Track listing - Disc 1: 1. "Sweet Pop!"; 2. "Start"; 3. "Stella"; 4. "→"; 5. "Remember"; 6. "Want Chu"; 7. "Soda"; 8. "Bii-San" (ビーサン); 9. "I × U"; 10. "Love Fighter!"; 11. "Are You Ready?"; 12. "Delay"; 13. "Guru Guru Wonderland" (ぐるぐるワンダーランド); 14. "Lucky Girl" (ラッキーガール); 15. "Koibana" (恋い花); 16. "Lost W"; Track listing - Disc 2: 1. "Bang! Bang! Bang!"; 2. "What Show Is It?"; 3. "Koi Yuki" (恋い雪); 4. "Soukai Rock" (爽快ロック); 5. "China Kiss" (チャイナキッス); 6. "Kakumei"; 7. "DanceMusiQ"; 8. "Jyoshikou Sensou" (女子校戦争); 9. "Hapi-Mari" (ハピマリ); 10. "Hachigatsu no Yoru" (八月の夜); 11. "Kimi Suki Smile" (キミスキスマイル); 12. "Wagamono Kotoba" (ワカモノコトバ); 13. "Cherry Bomb" (チェリボム); 14. "Yoshida-san" (吉田さん)	9
All Time Best Album: Silent	Released: December 15, 2021; Label: Universal Music Japan; Formats: CD, digital download; Track listing - Disc 1: 1. "Lingerie" (ランジェリー); 2. "Sepia" (セピア); 3. "All Right ('Ima' o Kakeru)" (All Right ～“今”を懸ける～); 4. "Love no Shirushi" (LOVEのしるし); 5. "Sweet Pop!"; 6. "Stella"; 7. "Bii-San" (ビーサン); 8. "Starmine"; 9. "Guru Guru Wonderland" (ぐるぐるワンダーランド); 10. "Lucky Girl" (ラッキーガール); 11. "Koi Bana" (恋花); 12. "Bang!Bang!Bang!"; 13. "Koi Yuki" (恋い雪); 14. "Hapi-Mari" (ハピマリ); 15. "Alarm"; 16. "Cherry Bomb" (チェリボム); Track listing - Disc 2: 1. "Milk Boy"; 2. "Yoshida-San" (吉田さん); 3. "Nukumor"; 4. "Love Balloon"; 5. "Akane"; 6. "Just Meet" (ジャストミート); 7. "Sayonara Hibiya" (さよなら日比谷); 8. "19 Summer Note"; 9. "Go Way!"; 10. "Melty"; 11. "Koino Esper" (恋のエスパー); 12. "Mujyuuryoku Dance" (無重力ダンス); 13. "Sotsugyou" (卒業); 14. "4gatsu no Kaze" (四月の風); 15. "Connect"; 16. "Familia"	
All Time Best Album: Siren	Released: December 15, 2021; Label: Universal Music Japan; Formats: CD, digital download; Track listing - Disc 1: 1. "Chiranai Hana" (チラナイハナ); 2. "Siren" (サイレン); 3. "Milky Way"; 4. "Mada minu ashita o" (まだ見ぬ明日を); 5. "Limited"; 6. "Lost.W"; 7. "What Show Is It?"; 8. "Sōkai rokku" (爽快ロック); 9. "China kiss" (チャイナキッス); 10. "Kakumei"; 11. "Routine"; 12. "DanceMusiQ"; 13. "Jyoshikou Sensou" (女子校戦争); 14. "Hachigatsu no yoru" (八月の夜); 15. "Love Install"; 16. "Slow Morning" (スローモーニング); Track listing - Disc 2: 1. "Fujiyama Disco" (フジヤマディスコ); 2. "Pandora"; 3. "Days."; 4. "Kaleidoscope"; 5. "Merry-Go-Round"; 6. "Knife"; 7. "Odoremotion"; 8. "Tenkaippin no Theme" (天下一品のテーマ); 9. "Cream Soda" (クリームソーダ); 10. "ALC.Monster"; 11. "Reborn"; 12. "Attack"; 13. "Hero"; 14. "Kikasete Wow Wow Wo" (聞かせてwow wowを); 15. "Answer"; 16. "Koi Ranman" (恋爛漫)	
"—" denotes releases that did not chart or were not released in that region.

=== Singles ===
Title	Year	Peak chart positions		Album
Title	Year	JPN Oricon	JPN Billboard	Album
"Sweet Pop!"	2012	23	11	Start
"Stella"	2013	19	16	Start
"Bii-San" (ビーサン)	2013	10	5	31 Wonderland
"I × U"	2013	9	7	31 Wonderland
"Lucky Girl" (ラッキーガール)	2014	6	10	Silent Siren
"Bang! Bang! Bang!"	2014	10	6	Silent Siren
"Koi Yuki" (恋い雪)	2014	10	10	Silent Siren
"Kakumei"	2015	8	12	Silent Siren
"Hapi-Mari" (ハピマリ)	2015	8	9	S
"Hachigatsu no Yoru" (八月の夜)	2015	8	13	S
"Alarm"	2015	5	—	S
"Fujiyama Disco" (フジヤマディスコ)	2017	5	—	Girls Power
"Akane / Awa Awa" (あわあわ)	2017	8	—	Girls Power
"Just Meet" (ジャストミート)	2017	6	—	Girls Power
"19 Summer Note"	2018	14	—	31313
"Go Way!"	2018	12	—	31313
"FAMILIA"	2021			ALL TIME BEST ALBUM『SILENT』
"Koi Ranman" (恋爛漫)	2021			ALL TIME BEST ALBUM『SIREN』
"—" denotes releases that did not chart or were not released in that region.

=== Video releases ===
Title	Release date	JPN Oricon DVD
"Silent Siren Music Clips I"	March 12, 2014	27
"Silent Siren Live Tour 2013 Fuyu ~Saisai Issaisai Konosai Asobi ni Kichainasai~ @Zepp DiverCity Tokyo" (Silent Siren Live Tour 2013冬～サイサイ1歳祭 この際遊びに来ちゃいなサイ！～@Zepp DiverCity TOKYO)	March 12, 2014	19
"Silent Siren Live Tour 2014→2015 Fuyu ~Budoukan e Go! Siren Go!~ @Nippon Budokan" (Silent Siren Live Tour 2014→2015冬～武道館へGo！サイレンGo！@日本武道館)	April 22, 2015	19
"Saisai TV! Ocha no Musume Saisai ~ Watashitachi Girls Band desu ga..." (サイサイてれび! おちゃの娘サイサイ～私たちガールズバンドですが…)	December 9, 2015	14
"Silent Siren 2015 Nenmatsu Special Live “Kakugo to Chousen”" (Silent Siren 2015年末スペシャルライブ「覚悟と挑戦」)	April 13, 2016	9
"Silent Siren Live Tour 2016 S no Tame ni S wo Nerae! Soshite Subete ga S ni Naru @Yokohama Arena" (Silent Siren Live Tour 2016 Sのために Sをねらえ! そしてすべてがSになる@横浜アリーナ)	December 21, 2016	34
"5th Anniversary Silent Siren Live Tour 2017 “Shinsekai” Nippon Budokan ~Kiseki~" (5th Anniversary Silent Siren Live Tour 2017「新世界」日本武道館 ～奇跡～)	March 7, 2018	9
"Tenkaippin presents Silent Siren Live Tour 2018 ~“Girls will be Bears” Tour~ @Toyosu Pit" (天下一品 presents Silent Siren Live Tour 2018 ～"Girls will be Bears" Tourr～ @豊洲pit)	October 17, 2018	7

=== Collaborations / other ===
- July 10, 2013: "Lovely Kiss 2 mixed" by DJ Shima Yuri with Go Go Friends (#10 Sweet Pop! / Silent Siren)
- June 25, 2014: "Lovely Kiss 3 mixed" by DJ Shima Yuri with Go Go Friends (#3 Besan / Silent Siren)
- April 4, 2018: "Sailor Star Song" by Naoko Takeuchi (#8 Pretty Guardian Sailor Moon The 25th Anniversary Memorial Tribute / Silent Siren)
- July 31, 2019: "No Girl No Cry" with Poppin'Party
- April 8, 2022: "Giri Giri" Kaguya-sama: Love is War Season 3 opening theme - by Masayuki Suzuki ft. Silent Siren

== Photobooks ==
- March 3, 2014: "Wonderbook"
