= Mitsubishi Motors Europe =

Mitsubishi Motors Europe B.V.
- Type: Subsidiary
- Founded: 2002; 24 years ago
- Headquarters: Born (Sittard-Geleen), Netherlands
- Key people: Frank Krol (President, CEO)
- Revenue: €4,418 million (2006)
- Operating income: €280 million (2006)
- Parent: Mitsubishi Motors
- Website: mitsubishi-motors-europe.com

Mitsubishi Motors Europe (MME) is the European headquarters and sales, distribution subsidiary of the Japanese automotive manufacturer Mitsubishi Motors. Their headquarters and distribution center are located in Born in the Netherlands.

== History ==
In 1991, Mitsubishi built the NedCar plant in the Netherlands as a joint venture with Volvo and the Dutch government. Mitsubishi bought out its partners in 2001 and became the sole owner of the plant. Mitsubishi entered a joint agreement with the European car manufacturer Renault in 1999. From 1999 onwards, Mitsubishi subcontracted production to Pininfarina in Turin, Italy with at least 35,000 units being produced annually. In 2010, a legal dispute between Mitsubishi and Pininfarina was settled. The International Chamber of Commerce deciding that Mitsubishi had overestimated the demand for the Mitsubishi Colt CZC and caused Pininfarina to lose money as a result of over production.

The European design studio Mitsubishi Design Europe (MDE) and the research and development center Mitsubishi R&D Europe (MRDE) are based at Trebur in Germany. Mitsubishi Motors Motor Sports (MMSP), responsible for the company representation in the Dakar Rally, is based in Pont-de-Vaux, France.

Historically, MME was responsible for sales within Russia. However, economic development in Russia during the 1990s and early 2000s drove annual sales from less than 50 in 1991 to 57,200 in 2006. At the time it represented the company's biggest market in Europe, and MME began treating Russia as a separate market. In addition, MME was greatly successful in the Ukrainian market, being the top selling brand for four consecutive years to 2007. At the time, the company oversaw 2,500 dealers in 36 countries.

MME's sales in Europe reached a peak of 340,000 vehicles between 2007 and 2008. However, sales began to decline afterwards, reaching 218,000 between 2011 and 2012. MME sold the Nedcar plant, which was no longer profitable, to VDL Groep for a token price of €1 in 2012, on the condition that none of the workers at the plant lose their jobs.

Nissan purchased a 34% stake in Mitsubishi in 2016, and formed the Renault–Nissan–Mitsubishi Alliance. The buyout occurred after the diesel emissions scandal revealed that Mitsubishi had been falsifying its fuel economy data. The scandal caused shares in the company to fall almost immediately. As part of MME's plan to increase sales in Europe, the company announced that it would increase spending on research and development in areas like electric vehicles.

In 2020, Mitsubishi announced that it was exiting the European market, after failing to generate a profit in the region. As part of this decision, the company would not market any new models of vehicle in Europe, and would focus on selling off existing models.

In 2021, it was announced that MME would return to the European market, although it would cease car sales in the United Kingdom by the end of that year. This decision came after reaching an agreement with Renault-Nissan, through which Renault would manufacture Mitsubishi cars in France. The company also resumed the production and sales of the Mitsubishi Colt, after not marketing the car in Europe for ten years.

The company's sales in the European market continued to decline in 2022. Due to logistical difficulties and supply chain issues caused by the 2022 Russian invasion of Ukraine, Mitsubishi ceased the production of vehicles at its plant in Kaluga in 2022.

== Production and sales figures ==
Year	Production	Sales
1995	19,100	n/a
1996	44,401	n/a
1997	82,255	n/a
1998	91,884	n/a
1999	113,331	n/a
2000	78,542	258,256
2001	79,261	212,983
2002	86,900	202,993
2003	75,276	213,567
2004	103,101	241,758
2005	68,551	267,220
2006	80,315	282,333*
2007	68,434	340,490*
2012	n/a	218,000

*Figures include Russia, although this market is no longer under MME jurisdiction.

(Sources: Fact & Figures 2000, Fact & Figures 2005, Fact & Figures 2008, Mitsubishi Motors website)
