= Mitsubishi Motors =

Japanese automobile manufacturer

Mitsubishi Motors Corporation

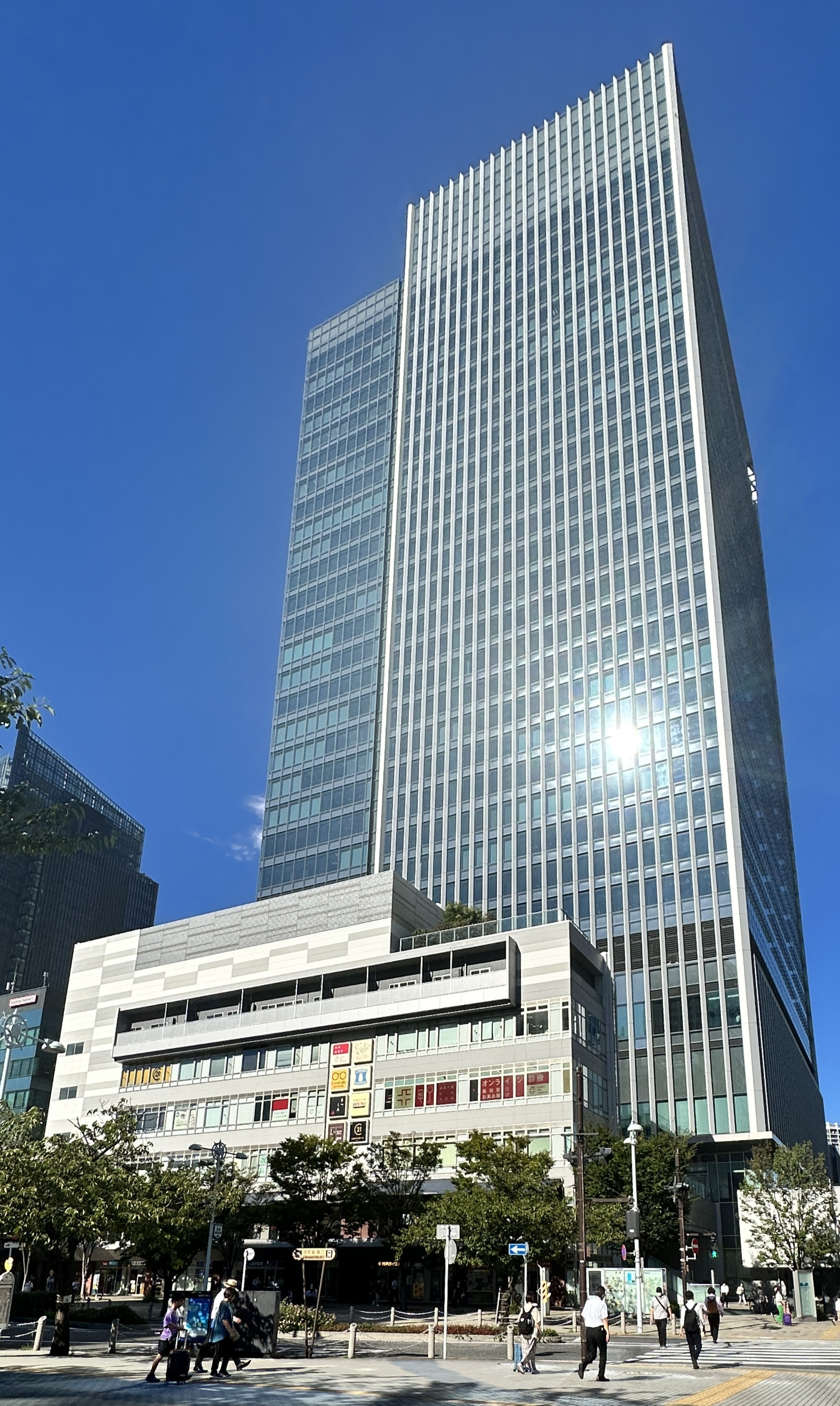
- Mitsubishi Motors's headquarters in Shibaura, Minato, Tokyo
- Native name: 三菱自動車工業株式会社
- Romanized name: Mitsubishi Jidōsha Kōgyō KK
- Type: Public
- Traded as: TYO: 7211
- Industry: Automotive
- Predecessor: Mitsubishi Heavy Industries Automobile Division
- Founded: 22 April 1970; 56 years ago
- Headquarters: Tamachi Station Tower S, Shibaura, Minato, Tokyo, Japan
- Area served: Worldwide (except India)
- Key people: Takao Kato (Representative Executive Officer & CEO); Keisuke Kishiura (President & COO); Tomofumi Hiraku (chairman); Seiji Watanabe (Chief Design Officer)
- Products: Passenger cars; Economy cars; Commercial vehicles; Sport utility vehicles
- Production output: ▼1,010,353 vehicles (FY2024)
- Revenue: ▲¥2.789 trillion (FY2024)
- Operating income: ▲¥190.971 billion (FY2024)
- Net income: ▼¥154.709 billion (FY2024)
- Total assets: ▲¥2.454 trillion (FY2024)
- Total equity: ▲¥1.044 trillion (FY2024)
- Owners: Nissan (24.53%); Mitsubishi Corporation (20%); Mitsubishi Heavy Industries (1.44%)
- Number of employees: 42,625 (total); 13,829 (non-consolidated) 28,796 (consolidated) (as of 10 November 2022)
- Subsidiaries: Transportation: NMKV; Ralliart; Engines: Harbin Dongan Automotive Engine Manufacturing; Sports: Urawa Red Diamonds; Mitsubishi Motors Mizushima; International: Mitsubishi Motors Australia; Mitsubishi Motors Europe; Mitsubishi Motors North America; Mitsubishi Motors Krama Yudha Indonesia; Mitsubishi Motors Philippines; Mitsubishi Motors (Thailand); Hunan Changfeng Motor
- Website: www.mitsubishi-motors.com

Mitsubishi Motors Corporation (三菱自動車工業株式会社, Mitsubishi Jidōsha Kōgyō KK; lit. 'Three Diamonds Automotive Industry Company', /mɪtsʊˈbiːʃi/, Japanese pronunciation: [mitsɯꜜbiɕi]) is a Japanese multinational automobile manufacturer headquartered in Minato, Tokyo, Japan. In 2011, Mitsubishi Motors was the sixth-largest Japanese automaker and the 19th-largest worldwide by production. Mitsubishi Motors took over as the 16th largest automaker worldwide by production in 2012. Since October 2016 Mitsubishi has been included in the Renault–Nissan–Mitsubishi Alliance, with Nissan owning a one-third stake in Mitsubishi from that time until November 2024, when their stake was scaled down to one quarter.

Besides being part of the Renault–Nissan–Mitsubishi Alliance, it is also a part of Mitsubishi keiretsu, formerly the biggest industrial group in Japan. The company was originally formed in 1970 from the automotive division of Mitsubishi Heavy Industries.

Mitsubishi Fuso Truck and Bus Corporation, which builds commercial-grade trucks, buses, and heavy construction equipment, was formerly a part of Mitsubishi Motors, but is now owned by German automotive corporation Daimler Truck, with Mitsubishi continuing to own a small stake.

== History ==
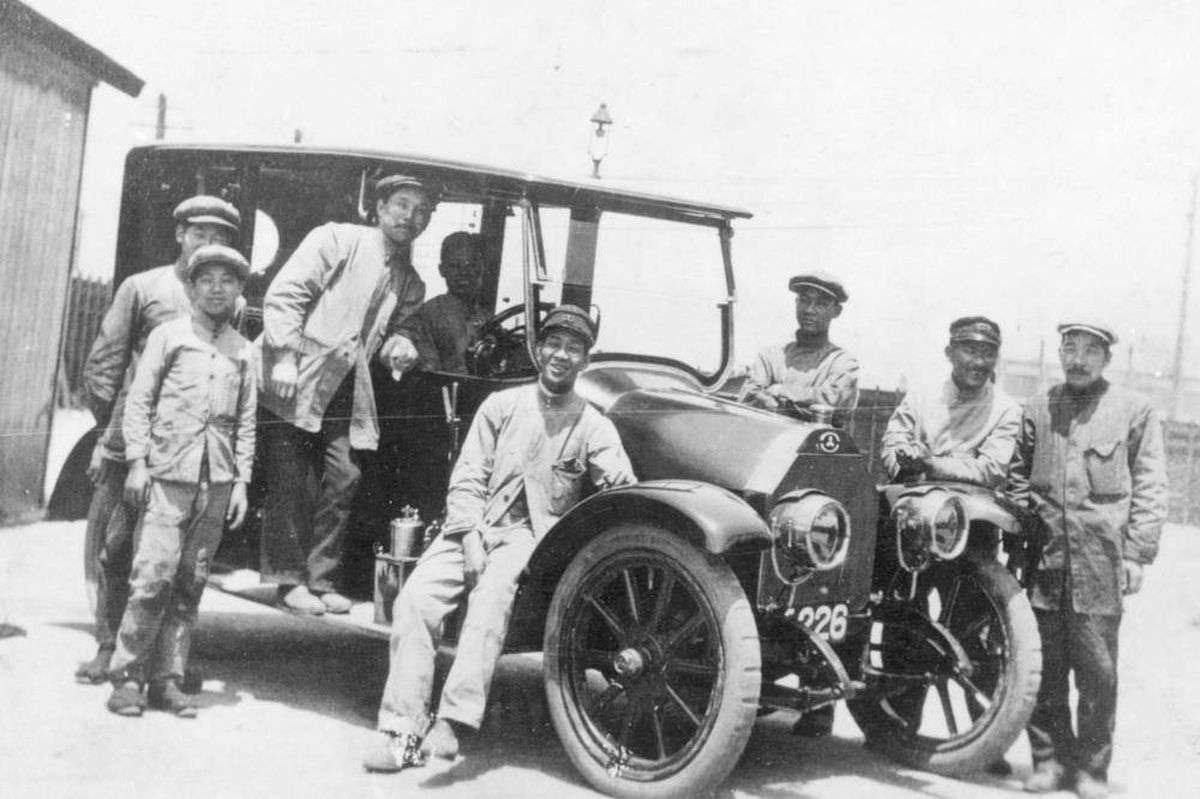
Workers at Mitsubishi Shipbuilding Co., Ltd, alongside one of the prototype Mitsubishi Model A automobiles (1917)

Mitsubishi motors' history began in 1917, when the Mitsubishi Shipbuilding Co., Ltd., introduced the Mitsubishi Model A, Japan's first series-production automobile. An entirely hand-built seven-seater sedan based on the FIAT Tipo 3, it proved expensive compared to its American and European mass-produced rivals, and was discontinued in 1921 after only 22 had been built.

In 1934, Mitsubishi Shipbuilding was merged with the Mitsubishi Aircraft Co., a company established in 1920 to manufacture aircraft engines and other parts. The unified company was known as Mitsubishi Heavy Industries (MHI), and was the largest private company in Japan. MHI concentrated on manufacturing aircraft, ships, railroad cars and machinery, but in 1937 developed the PX33, a prototype sedan for military use. It was the first Japanese-built passenger car with full-time four-wheel drive, a technology the company would return to almost 50 years later in its quest for motorsport and sales success.

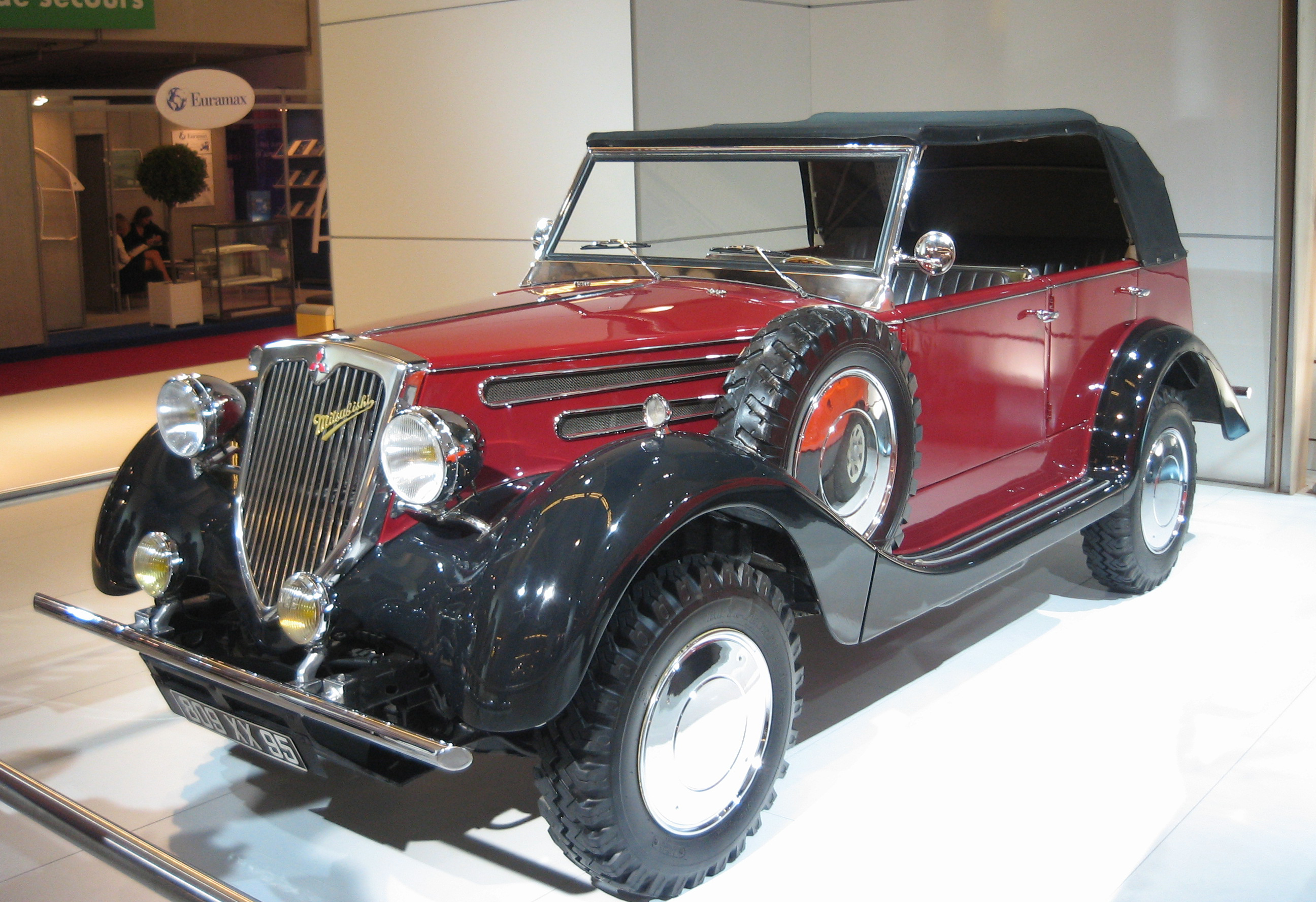
A 1937 Mitsubishi PX33 on display at the Mondial de l'Automobile in September 2006

=== Post-World War history ===
Logo of Mitsubishi Motors from 1983 to 2017

Immediately following the end of the Second World War, the company returned to manufacturing vehicles. Fuso bus production resumed, while a small three-wheeled cargo vehicle called the Mizushima and a scooter called the Silver Pigeon were also developed. However, the zaibatsu (Japan's family-controlled industrial conglomerates) were ordered to be dismantled by the Allied powers in 1950, and Mitsubishi Heavy Industries was split into three regional companies, each with an involvement in motor-vehicle development: West Japan Heavy-Industries, Central Japan Heavy-Industries, and East Japan Heavy-Industries.

East Japan Heavy-Industries began importing the Henry J, an inexpensive American sedan built by Kaiser Motors, in knockdown kit (CKD) form in 1951, and continued to bring them to Japan for the remainder of the car's three-year production run. The same year, Central Japan Heavy-Industries concluded a similar contract with Willys (now owned by Kaiser) for CKD-assembled Jeep CJ-3Bs. This deal proved more durable, with licensed Mitsubishi Jeeps in production until 1998, 30 years after Willys had replaced the model.

By the beginning of the 1960s, Japan's economy was gearing up; wages were rising and the idea of family motoring was taking off. Central Japan Heavy-Industries, now known as Shin Mitsubishi Heavy-Industries, had already re-established an automotive department in its headquarters in 1953. Now, it was ready to introduce the Mitsubishi 500, a mass-market sedan, to meet the new demand from consumers. It followed this in 1962 with the Minica kei car and the Colt 1000, the first of its Colt line of family cars, in 1963. In 1964, Mitsubishi introduced its largest passenger sedan, the Mitsubishi Debonair as a luxury car primarily for the Japanese market, and was used by senior Mitsubishi executives as a company car.

West Japan Heavy-Industries (now renamed Mitsubishi Shipbuilding and Engineering) and East Japan Heavy-Industries (now Mitsubishi Nihon Heavy-Industries) had also expanded their automotive departments in the 1950s, and the three were reintegrated as Mitsubishi Heavy Industries in 1964. Within three years, its output was over 75,000 vehicles annually. Following the successful introduction of the first Galant in 1969 and similar growth with its commercial-vehicle division, the company decided to create a single operation to focus on the automotive industry. Mitsubishi Motors Corporation (MMC) was formed on 22 April 1970, as a wholly owned subsidiary of MHI under the leadership of Tomio Kubo, a successful engineer from the aircraft division.

The logo of three red diamonds, shared with over 40 other companies within the keiretsu, antedates Mitsubishi Motors itself by almost a century. It was chosen by Iwasaki Yatarō, the founder of Mitsubishi, as it was suggestive of the emblem of the Tosa clan who first employed him, and because his own family crest was three rhombi stacked atop each other. The name Mitsubishi (三菱) consists of two parts – mitsu meaning "three" and hishi (which becomes "bishi" under rendaku) meaning "water caltrop" (also called "water chestnut"), and hence "rhombus", which is reflected in the company's logo.

=== 1970s: Chrysler partnership ===
Part of Tomio Kubo's expansion strategy was to increase exports by forging alliances with well-established foreign companies. Therefore, in 1971, MHI sold U.S. automotive giant Chrysler a 15% share in the new company. Thanks to this deal, Chrysler began selling the Galant in the United States as the Dodge Colt (which was the first rebadged Mitsubishi product sold by Chrysler), pushing MMC's annual production beyond 250,000 vehicles. In 1977, the Galant was sold as the Chrysler Sigma in Australia.

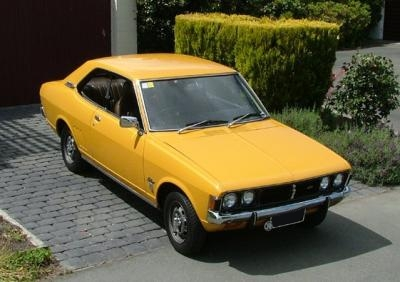
A 1973 Mitsubishi Galant, the basis for the company's first captive import deal with Chrysler

By 1977, a network of "Colt"-branded distribution and sales dealerships had been established across Europe, as Mitsubishi sought to begin selling vehicles directly. Annual production had by now grown from 500,000 vehicles in 1973 to 965,000 in 1978, when Chrysler began selling the Galant as the Dodge Challenger and the Plymouth Sapporo. However, this expansion was beginning to cause friction; Chrysler saw its overseas markets for subcompacts as being directly encroached by its Japanese partners, while MMC felt the Americans were demanding too much say in its corporate decisions.

=== 1980s: U.S. entry ===
Mitsubishi Motors finally achieved annual production of a million cars in 1980, but by this time, its ally was not so healthy; as part of its battle to avoid bankruptcy, Chrysler was forced to sell its Australian manufacturing division to MMC that year. The new Japanese owners renamed it Mitsubishi Motors Australia Ltd (MMAL).

In 1982, the Mitsubishi brand was introduced to the American market for the first time. The Tredia sedan, and the Cordia and Starion coupés were initially sold through 70 dealers in 22 states, with an allocation of 30,000 vehicles among them. This quota, restricted by mutual agreement between the two countries' governments, had to be included among the 120,000 cars earmarked for Chrysler. A restricting element of Mitsubishi's deal with Chrysler was that Chrysler had the right of first refusal of any Mitsubishi automobiles in the US market until 1990. Toward the end of the 1980s, as MMC initiated a major push to increase its U.S. presence, it aired its first national television advertising campaign and made plans to increase its network to 340 dealers.

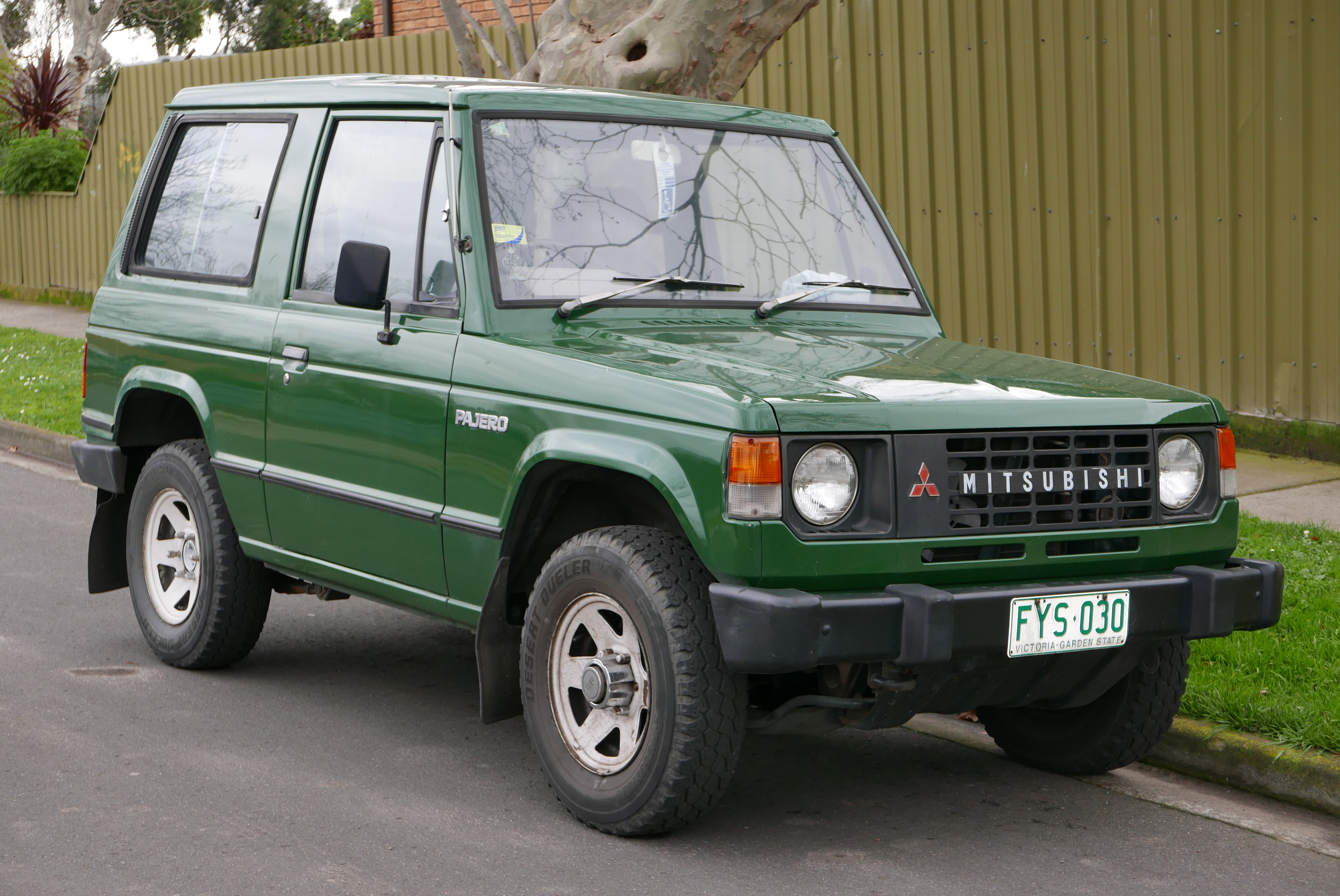
A 1984 Mitsubishi Pajero, the company's most successful SUV

Despite the ongoing tensions between Chrysler and Mitsubishi, they agreed to unite in a vehicle manufacturing operation in Normal, Illinois. The 50/50 venture provided a way to circumvent the voluntary import restrictions, while providing a new line of compact and subcompact cars for Chrysler. Diamond-Star Motors (DSM)—from the parent companies' logos: three diamonds (Mitsubishi) and a pentastar (Chrysler)—was incorporated in October 1985, and in April 1986, ground was broken on a 1.9-million-square-foot (177,000 m^{2}) production facility in Normal. In 1987, the company was selling 67,000 cars a year in the U.S., but when the plant was completed in March 1988, it offered an annual capacity of 240,000 vehicles. Initially, three platform-sharing compact 2+2 coupés were released, the Mitsubishi Eclipse, Eagle Talon, and Plymouth Laser, with other models being introduced in subsequent years.

In 1983, Mitsubishi expanded its Middle Eastern distribution network by appointing Al Habtoor Motors LLC as its exclusive authorized dealer in the United Arab Emirates. The agreement established a regional infrastructure of showrooms and service facilities spanning Dubai, Abu Dhabi, and the Northern Emirates. This network assumed responsibility for the sales, domestic distribution, and technical maintenance of the manufacturer's passenger cars, off-road vehicles, and commercial trucks.

In 1986 Mitsubishi reached an agreement with Liuzhou Automotive to assemble its Minicab kei van and truck there, making Mitsubishi the third Japanese manufacturer (after Daihatsu and Suzuki) to begin assembly in China. Before receiving government approval for this project, Mitsubishi had to express contrition over "defective" Mitsubishi trucks imported to China in 1984 and 1985. By 1989, Mitsubishi's worldwide production, including its overseas affiliates, had reached 1.5 million units.

Mitsubishi Motors went public in 1988, ending its status as the only one of Japan's 11 auto manufacturers to be privately held. Mitsubishi Heavy Industries agreed to reduce its share to 25%, retaining its position as largest single stockholder. Chrysler, meanwhile, increased its holding to over 20%. The capital raised by this initial offering enabled Mitsubishi to pay off part of its debts, as well as to expand its investments throughout Southeast Asia, where it was by now operating in the Philippines, Malaysia, and Thailand.

=== 1990s: SUV focus ===
Hirokazu Nakamura became president of Mitsubishi Motors in 1989, and steered the company in some promising directions, with the advent of the Japanese asset price bubble "market correction" that led to the Lost Decade as a result of the Plaza Accord agreement signed in 1985. Sales of the company's new Pajero were bucking conventional wisdom by becoming popular even in the crowded streets of Japan.

Japanese media rumored in 1992 and 1993 that Mitsubishi Motors intended a hostile acquisition of Honda. While Mitsubishi was riding high off of profitable vehicles such as the Diamante and Pajero, Honda was caught off-guard with the SUV and truck boom, and was losing focus after the illness and later death of its founder. Honda CEO Nobuhiko Kawamoto took drastic steps, though, such as exiting Formula 1 and discontinuing unprofitable vehicles to avert a Mitsubishi takeover, which proved effective.

Although sales of SUVs and light trucks were booming in the U.S., Japan's car manufacturers dismissed the idea that such a trend could occur in their own country. Nakamura, however, increased the budget for SUV product development, and his gamble paid off; Mitsubishi's wide line of four-wheel drive vehicles, from the Mitsubishi Pajero Mini kei car to the Delica Space Gear passenger van, rode the wave of SUV-buying in Japan in the early to mid-1990s, and Mitsubishi saw its overall domestic share rise to 11.6% in 1995.

In 1991, Chrysler sold its equity stake in Diamond-Star Motors to its partner Mitsubishi Motors, and from then on the two companies continued to share components and manufacturing on a contractual basis only. Chrysler decreased its interest in Mitsubishi Motors to less than 3% in 1992, and announced its decision to divest itself of all its remaining shares on the open market in 1993. The two companies then terminated their close alliance, with Mitsubishi Motors no longer supplying parts for engines and transmissions for Chrysler. After this period, the company sought alliances with many other automotive manufacturers in different areas of the world, as described under "other alliances" below, with its most economically significant alliance being with Nissan to develop and manufacture kei cars.

=== 2000s ===
Mitsubishi Heavy Industries (MHI) participated in a ¥540-billion emergency rescue of Mitsubishi Motors in January 2005, in partnership with Mitsubishi Corporation and Mitsubishi Tokyo Financial Group. As part of the rescue, MHI acquired ¥50 billion of Mitsubishi Motors stock, increasing its ownership stake to 15% and making the automaker an affiliate again. The emergency rescue was carried out 4 years after a product recall scandal in Japan that was triggered by accusations of Mitsubishi Motors trying to systematically hide manufacturing defects to avoid recalls, and marketing problems in the US.

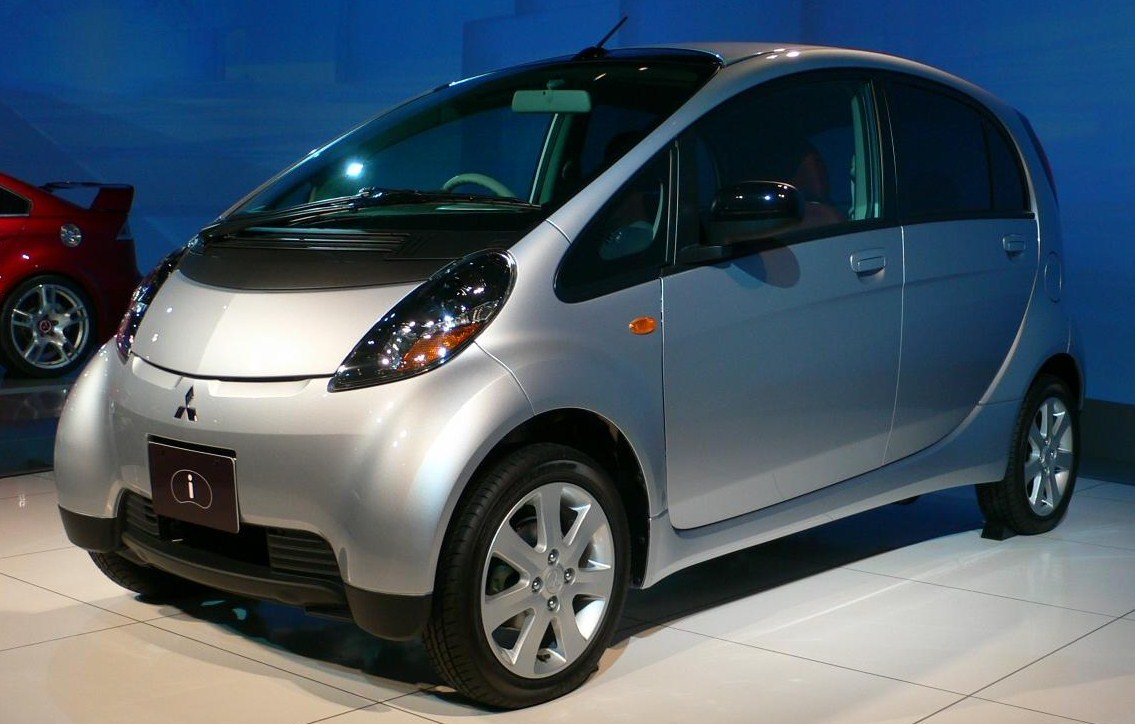
The Mitsubishi i at the Tokyo Motor Show in 2005

After a starvation of new investment caused by lack of cashflow, the company introduced the award-winning Mitsubishi i kei car in 2006, its first new model in 29 months, while a revised Outlander has been introduced worldwide to compete in the popular XUV market niche. The next generation of its Lancer and Lancer Evolution was launched in 2007 and 2008.

Slow-selling vehicles were eliminated from the U.S. market, purchase projections for the Global Engine Manufacturing Alliance have been scaled back, and 10,000 jobs were shed to cut costs with 3,400 workers at its Australian plant and other loss-making operations still under threat. Meanwhile, in an effort to increase production at its U.S. facility, new export markets for the Eclipse and Galant were being explored in Ukraine, the Middle East, and Russia, where the company's bestselling dealership is located. Mitsubishi Motors has also been active in OEM production of cars for Nissan, and announced a similar partnership with Groupe PSA in July 2005 to manufacture an SUV on its behalf.

Mitsubishi Motors reported its first profitable quarter in four years in the third quarter of 2006, and returned to profitability by the end of the 2006 financial year, and sustained profitability and global sales of 1,524,000 through 2007 and later.

In January 2011, the company announced its next midterm business plan to introduce eight hybrid and battery-powered models by 2015. It aimed to sell its first two plug-in hybrids by fiscal 2012.

In March 2015, Mitsubishi Motors started the construction of a new manufacturing plant in Indonesia under a joint venture with Mitsubishi Corporation (40%) and a local company Krama Yudha Group (9%), with the maximum production capacity of 160,000 vehicles per year.

In July 2015, the Mitsubishi Motors announced that it plans to end production at the Diamond-Star Motors plant in Normal, Illinois, US, as the plant has been operating well below capacity for several years. Operations at the facility ended in May 2016. The plant was sold to Maynards Industries, which sold the site to American electric vehicle startup Rivian in 2017.

=== 2016–present: Renault–Nissan–Mitsubishi Alliance membership ===
In May 2016, in the wake of the fuel-efficiency scandal uncovered by Nissan (discussed in "Fuel economy scandal"), Nissan began the acquisition of a 34% stake in Mitsubishi Motors, with the aim of making Nissan the largest and controlling shareholder of Mitsubishi and turning Mitsubishi Motors into a member of the Renault–Nissan Alliance (the "Alliance"). Nissan has said that they plan to share some car platforms and jointly develop future vehicles with Mitsubishi Motors. Nissan's acquisition of the 34% controlling interest in Mitsubishi Motors was completed in October 2016, when Carlos Ghosn, the chairman of Nissan, Renault, and the Alliance, also became chairman of Mitsubishi Motors. Ghosn remained chairman of Mitsubishi until his dismissal following his arrest by the Japanese government in November 2018, when Mitsubishi Motors CEO Osamu Masuko assumed the chairmanship.

By 2023, Renault Group began supplying Mitsubishi cars in Europe, with the Renault Clio and Renault Captur rebadge as the Colt and ASX. The firm has no plans to sell any of the models in Britain or Ireland, as the Colt Car Company's Mitsubishi aftersales business was bought as a going concern by International Motors (a firm previously known for launching Hyundai onto the UK market in 1981).

Mitsubishi Motors plans to stop developing car platforms for the Japanese market and instead use vehicle bases made by ally Nissan Motor beginning around 2026.

== Other alliances ==
=== 1974–1984: Colt and Lonsdale ===
The Colt name appears frequently in Mitsubishi's history since its introduction as a rear-engine 600-cc sedan in the early 1960s. Today, it most commonly refers to the Mitsubishi Colt subcompact in the company's line-up, but is also the name of MMC's import/distribution company in the United Kingdom, the Colt Car Company, established in 1974. For the first decade of its existence, before Far Eastern auto manufacturers had established their reputations, its cars carried the "Colt" badge in Britain instead of "Mitsubishi".

In 1982 and 1983, Mitsubishi introduced the Australian-built Mitsubishi Sigma to the UK as the Lonsdale YD41 in an attempt to circumvent British import quotas, but the new brand was unsuccessful. It then carried Mitsubishi Sigma badges in 1983–84 before abandoning this operation entirely.

=== 1975–2003: Hyundai ===
South Korean manufacturer Hyundai, built the Hyundai Pony in 1975 using MMC's Saturn engine and transmissions. Korea's first car, it remained in production for 13 years. Mitsubishi held up to a 10% stake in the company, until disposing of the last of its remaining shares in March 2003.

The 1985 Hyundai Excel was sold in the United States as the Mitsubishi Precis between 1987 and 1994, whereas several other Mitsubishi models were rebadged as Hyundai, namely the Mitsubishi Chariot (as the Hyundai Santamo), the Mitsubishi Pajero (as the Hyundai Galloper) or the Mitsubishi Delica (as the Hyundai Porter) and Mitsubishi Proudia (as the Hyundai Equus).

=== 1985–1991: Samcor ===
The South African Motor Corporation (Samcor) (previously also called Sigma Corporation and MMI) was a joint venture created in 1985, which produced Ford, Mazda, and Mitsubishi vehicles for the local South African market, with the Mitsubishi Delica being rebadged as the Ford Husky minibus and the Mitsubishi Canter as the Ford Triton light truck. Samcor also made a version of the Mazda 323 for the UK market called the Sao Penza, which was a marque like Lonsdale YD41, invented to get around British import quotas.

=== 1985–2010: Proton ===
Malaysian manufacturer Proton was initially very dependent on Mitsubishi Motors, assembling its 1985 Proton Saga using mostly MMC components at a newly established facility in Shah Alam. Subsequent models like the Wira and Perdana were based on the Lancer/Colt and Galant/Eterna, respectively, before the company finally produced entirely self-developed vehicles, the Waja in 2000, and the Proton Gen-2 in 2004. At its peak, the Proton controlled 75% of its domestic market, even after Mitsubishi ended its 22-year partnership in 2005, selling its 7.9% stake for RM384 million to Khazanah Nasional Berhad. However, in October 2008, Proton renewed its technology-transfer agreements with MMC, and the Proton Inspira (the Proton Waja replacement) was again based on the Mitsubishi Lancer platform and officially launched on 10 November 2010.

=== 1991–2012: Volvo Cars ===
Mitsubishi participated in a joint venture with rival carmaker Volvo and the Dutch government at the former DAF plant in Born in 1991. The operation, branded NedCar, began producing the first-generation Mitsubishi Carisma alongside the Volvo S40/V40 in 1996. The factory later produced the latest Mitsubishi Colt and the related Smart Forfour (partner DaimlerChrysler cancelled its production in 2006). Production of European market-bound Mitsubishi Outlanders, and badge-engineered versions of this vehicle, were also manufactured in the Netherlands until 2012, when the company sold the plant to the Dutch industrial conglomerate VDL Groep. Mitsubishi Motors Europe's headquarters and its European distribution center are still based in Born.

=== 1991–2019: Suzuki ===
In Indonesia, Mitsubishi offered the Colt T120SS light truck between 1991 and 2019 based on the Suzuki Carry. Despite the same bodywork, the fascia is unique to Mitsubishi and it is manufactured in the local Mitsubishi plant. The engine used is either Mitsubishi's 1.3 L (1,343 cc) carbureted 4G17 or the bigger 1.5 L (1,468 cc) fuel-injected 4G15. In 2005, the alliance continued by rebadging the Suzuki APV to Mitsubishi Maven. Few styling changes were applied, and the 4G15 engine was used instead of Suzuki's G15A engine. The Maven was discontinued in 2009 due to poor sales. The Colt T120SS was discontinued in 2019 as the base vehicle, the Suzuki Carry was updated, and Mitsubishi was not interested in continuing the alliance.

In Japan, Mitsubishi had rebadged the Suzuki Solio as the Delica D:2 and the Suzuki Every as the Minicab.

=== 1998–2016: Hindustan ===
Indian manufacturer Hindustan had a joint venture with Mitsubishi that started 1998. Models produced at the Tiruvallur, Tamil Nadu plant included the Mitsubishi Pajero Sport (third generation) until 2016.

=== 1999–2001: Volvo Trucks ===
Upon selling its Volvo Cars division to Ford in January 1999, Volvo Group purchased a 5% stake in Mitsubishi Motors in November of that same year, but sold its stake to shareholder DaimlerChrysler in March 2001.

=== 1999–2011: Groupe PSA ===
Mitsubishi Motors had allied with the PSA Group since 1999, after they agreed to co-operate on the development of diesel engines using the Japanese company's gasoline direct injection technology. They united again in 2005 to develop the Peugeot 4007 and Citroën C-Crosser sport utility vehicles (SUVs), based on the Japanese company's Mitsubishi Outlander.

Two further ties were established between the companies in 2008, first with the establishment of a jointly owned production facility in Kaluga, which would manufacture up to 160,000 Outlander-based SUVs for the fast-growing Russian market. They were also collaborating in the research and development of electric powertrains for small urban vehicles. Japanese newspaper Nikkei claimed that PSA will sell the electric city car Mitsubishi iMIEV in Europe by 2011.

=== 2004–2010: Volkswagen ===
In Europe, diesel engines supplied by German manufacturer Volkswagen were used for some of its mid-sized cars, such as the Lancer, Grandis, and Outlander. From 2010, they were superseded with Mitsubishi's self-developed 4N1 diesel engines.

=== 2006–2024: Chinese joint ventures ===
As of 2006, Mitsubishi had four joint ventures with Chinese partners:

- South East (Fujian) Motor Co Ltd
- Shenyang Aerospace Mitsubishi Motors Engine Manufacturing Co Ltd
- Harbin Dongan Automotive Engine Manufacturing Co Ltd – a subsidiary of Harbin Hafei Automobile Industry Group Co Ltd
- Hunan Changfeng Motor Co Ltd – a subsidiary of Chang Feng (Group) Co Ltd

=== 2010–present: Nissan, Renault–Nissan–Mitsubishi ===
In December 2010, Mitsubishi and Nissan agreed to form a joint venture (later named "NMKV Co., Ltd.") to develop kei cars for the Japanese market. In 2016, Nissan uncovered evidence that Mitsubishi's fuel-economy testing numbers were erroneous and had been erroneous since the start of the venture, affecting 625,000 cars produced by NMKV. The result of the "fuel economy scandal" was that Nissan acquired a controlling interest in Mitsubishi.

=== 2024–present: Nissan and Honda alliance ===
In July 2024, Mitsubishi Motors and Nissan announced a partnership with Honda for the joint development of their future electric models. On 23 December 2024, Honda officially announced an MOU had been entered to merge with Japanese car company Nissan to become the 3rd largest auto company by sales. Mitsubishi Motors, in which Nissan has 24% ownership, also agreed to join the talks of integration. In mid February 2025, Nissan, Honda, and Mitsubishi ended talks due to the talks shifting to Nissan becoming a subsidiary of Honda, which Nissan refused as it wouldn't have allowed the potential of Nissan to be realized. Despite this, Nissan, Honda, and Mitsubishi will continue forward with the partnership formed in July 2024.

== Japan sales channels ==
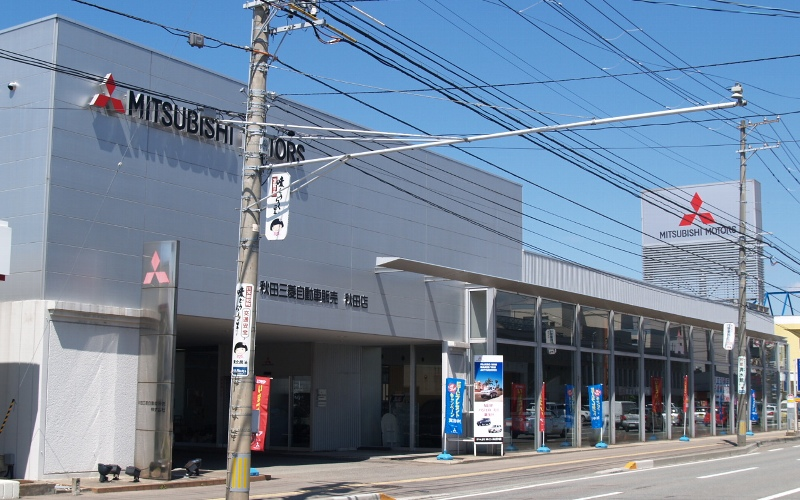
A Mitsubishi Motors dealer in Akita

Mitsubishi Motors maintained two retail sales channels that sold specific models, called "Car Plaza" and "Galant Shop". Certain models were exclusive to either channel, while some models were available at both channels, as required by local Japanese market conditions. In 2003, the sales channels have been combined into one franchise that sells all models, including kei cars and commercial delivery vehicles.

== Mitsubishi Motors Slogans ==
- エンジンの三菱（1967–1968, English: Mitsubishi, The Engine Company）
- 技術と信頼の三菱（1969–1972, English: Mitsubishi, Technology & Trust）
- 安全は人と車でつくるもの（1975–1978, English: Safety is Created by People and Cars）
- 安全に走れ。それが一番早いのだ。（1978–1980, English: Drive Safely, That is the Fastest Way）
- 燃費の差は技術の差（1980–1981, English: A Difference in Fuel Economy, Is A Difference in Technology）
- 燃費は技術（1981–1982, Fuel Economy is Technology）
- 未来をひらく技術と信頼（1982–1985, English: Technology and Trust Opens Up The Future）
- BE BEST for good days いつもベストを (1985–1987)
- sparkling now (1985–1987)
- いい街 いい人 いい車（1986–1987, English: Great Town, Great People, Great Cars）
- 新技術を、ときめきに。 NEW Motoring Wave（1987–1992, English: New Motoring Wave, Turning New Technology into Excitement）
- あなたと創る Creating Together（1993–1995, English: Creating Together）
- MITSUBISHI STAR CARS もっとクルマをおもしろく。元気、三菱。(1996, English: MITSUBISHI STAR CARS, Making Cars more Exciting, Energetic Mitsubishi)
- その差が、三菱。（1996–1998, English: That Difference is Mitsubishi）
- いいもの ながく（1998–1999, English: Quality That Lasts）
- Heart-Beat Motors (2000–2005)
- 答えは、クルマで出します。（2005, English: We Find The Answers Through This Car）
- クルマづくりの原点へ。（2005–2006, English: Returning to the Fundaments Of Carmaking）
- ミツビシミテカラ（2006–2008, English: Check Out The Mitsubishi）
- Drive@earth (2008–2017)
- Drive Your Ambition (2017–present)

== Historical troubles ==
=== Asian economic downturn ===
The benefits Mitsubishi Motors had seen because of its strong presence in Southeast Asia reversed themselves as a result of the economic crisis in the region, which began in 1991 with the advent of the collapse of the Japanese asset price bubble, referred to in Japan as the beginning of the Lost Decade and continued to 1997. The collapse was partly the result of the Plaza Accord agreement in 1985, which sought to equalize the United States dollar with the Japanese yen and the German mark. In September of that year, the company closed its Thai factory in response to a crash in the country's currency and plummeting consumer demand. The large truck plant, which had produced 8,700 trucks in 1996, was shut down indefinitely. In addition, Mitsubishi Motors had little support from sales in Japan, which slowed considerably throughout 1997, and were affected by that country's own economic uncertainty into 1998.

Other Japanese automakers, such as Toyota and Honda, bolstered their own slipping domestic sales with success in the U.S. However, with a comparatively small percentage of the American market, the turmoil in the Asian economy had a greater effect on Mitsubishi Motors, and the company's 1997 losses were the worst in its history. In addition, it lost both its rank as the third-largest automaker in Japan to Mazda, and market share overseas. Its stock price fell precipitously, prompting the company to cancel its year-end dividend payment.

In November 1997, Mitsubishi Motors hired Katsuhiko Kawasoe to replace Takemune Kimura as company president. Kawasoe unveiled an aggressive restructuring program that aimed to cut costs by ¥350 billion in three years, reduce personnel by 1,400, and return the company to profitability by 1998. While the program had some initial success, the company's sales were still stagnant as the Asian economy continued to sputter. In 1999, Mitsubishi Motors was forced once again to skip dividend payments. Its interest-bearing debt totaled ¥1.7 trillion.

=== Vehicle defect cover-up ===
In what was referred to as "one of the largest corporate scandals in Japanese history", Mitsubishi Motors was twice forced to admit to systematically covering up defect problems in its vehicles. Four defects were first publicized in 2000, but in 2004, it confessed to 26 more going back as far as 1977, including failing brakes, fuel leaks, and malfunctioning clutches. The effect on the company was catastrophic, forcing it to recall 163,707 cars (156,433 in Japan and 7,274 overseas) for free repair.

Further recalls by Fuso Truck and Bus brought the total number of vehicles requiring repair to almost one million. The affair led to the resignation and subsequent arrest of president Kawasoe, along with 23 other employees who were also implicated. Three of them have since been acquitted, with the judge stating that no official request from the Transport Ministry ordered them to submit a defect report.

=== 0–0–0 ===
In an effort to boost sales in the U.S. in the early 2000s, Mitsubishi Motors began offering a "0–0–0" finance offer—0% down, 0% interest, and $0 monthly payments (all repayments deferred for 12 months). Initially, sales leapt, but at the end of the year's "grace period", numerous credit-risky buyers defaulted, leaving the company with used vehicles for which it had received no money and which were now worth less than they cost to manufacture. The company's American credit operation, MMCA, was eventually forced to make a US$454 million provision against its 2003 accounts as a result of these losses. As a result, sales plummeted to 243,000 in 2003, 139,000 in 2004, 124,000 in 2005, and 119,000 in 2006.

=== End of Australian production ===
In October 2005, Mitsubishi Motors Australia introduced the Mitsubishi 380 to the Australian market as the replacement for its long-running Mitsubishi Magna, and the sole vehicle being built at its Australian assembly plant at Clovelly Park. Despite an investment of A$600 million developing the car, initial sales projections proved optimistic; after only six months, Mitsubishi scaled back production from 90/day, and reduced the working week from five days to four. The Australian auto industry remained concerned as to whether this would be sufficient to restore the plant to profitability and ensure its long-term survival.

The drop in local sales could not be mitigated by exports outside of the Australian and New Zealand markets. On 5 February 2008, Mitsubishi Motors Australia announced it would be closing down its Adelaide assembly plant by the end of March. Between 700 and 1,000 direct jobs would be lost and up to 2,000 jobs would be lost in industries supporting Mitsubishi's local manufacturing operations.

=== End of Western European production ===
With operating losses ¥22 billion ($287 million) in Europe for the fiscal year to March due to stagnant sales in a continent beset by uncertainty of a raging debt crisis, in February 2012, Mitsubishi Motors decided to end production in Western Europe by the end of 2012. On 1 October, it announced that the Dutch industrial conglomerate VDL Groep had taken over NedCar from Mitsubishi Motors, retaining all 1,500 employees.

=== End of North American production ===
In 1988, Mitsubishi Motors opened a production facility in the United States in Normal, Illinois. The facility was known as Diamond-Star Motors, and was initially a joint venture with Chrysler, but Chrysler sold its stake in the plant to Mitsubishi in 1993. After 1995, the facility was known as Mitsubishi Motors Manufacturing America (MMMA). At its peak in 2000, the facility produced over 222,000 vehicles per year, but following the decline of Mitsubishi Motors in North America, the plant operated well below capacity for years.

In July 2015, Mitsubishi Motors announced that it would close the plant by November, but would continue to sell automobiles in North America. In 2014, the plant had produced just 69,000 vehicles, roughly one-quarter of its capacity. Production at the plant ended on 30 November 2015, and most of the employees were laid off. The plant continued to operate with a minimal staff to produce replacement parts until May 2016, after which it closed permanently.

=== Withdrawal from UK market ===
Mitsubishi Motors announced that the company would leave the UK market due to financial reasons by autumn 2021. Since then, Mitsubishi's British presence is limited to aftersales service.

=== Withdrawal from Chinese market ===
Mitsubishi Motors announced its withdrawal from its joint venture GAC Mitsubishi in the Chinese market in October 2023. As part of this exit, GAC Group will take over GAC Mitsubishi's plant in Changsha to produce GAC Aion electric vehicles. This did not affect the Shenyang Aerospace-Mitsubishi Motors engine manufacturing joint venture, which continued production to supply engines to local Chinese automakers and provide aftersales service for Mitsubishi vehicles.

After being established in 1997 and beginning production in 1998 to produce engines for Mitsubishi vehicles and to prominently supply at the time fledgling local Chinese automakers, Mitsubishi announced that it was exiting the Shenyang Aerospace-Mitsubishi Motors Engine Manufacturing joint venture on 22 July 2025. Mitsubishi stated that it made the decision due to the Chinese auto industry's rapid shift to electric vehicle, and it marks the complete exit of the company from the Chinese market.

=== Fuel economy scandal ===
In early 2016, Mitsubishi Motors partner Nissan found discrepancies between Mitsubishi information and actual fuel consumption while working in new micro (kei) cars for both companies, the eK Wagon, eK Space, Nissan Dayz, and Nissan Dayz Roox. At the time, Mitsubishi Motors manufactured micro cars for Nissan, which had never produced that class of vehicle itself. Mitsubishi Motors admitted that they had been giving incorrect information on fuel consumption from 2002 onwards, using inaccurate test methods. Later, the company said it used fuel-economy testing methods that did not comply with Japanese regulations for 25 years, much longer than previously known.

Mitsubishi Motors management said they were unaware about the issue and that the incorrect information came from the micro car development department, NMKV. They ordered an investigation led by investigators not affiliated with the company. The resultant scandal culminated in Nissan acquiring a controlling interest in MMC in May 2016. As a consequence, Nissan agreed to invest 237.4 billion yen (US$2.2 billion) in exchange for receiving a 34% controlling ownership stake in Mitsubishi Motors.

Due to dilution of existing shares, other Mitsubishi group companies (Mitsubishi Heavy Industries, Mitsubishi Corp., and Bank of Tokyo-Mitsubishi UFJ) had their combined holdings in Mitsubishi Motors fall to about 20% from 34% previously.

MMNA stated that vehicles sold from 2013 in the United States featured accurate fuel-economy information and were thereby not affected by the scandal.

In May 2016, Mitsubishi Motors announced Tetsuro Aikawa was to resign as the president of the company in effect in June 2016. Both Mitsubishi Motors and Aikawa denied any top management involvement in the mileage scandal. The company said much of the mileage-testing work was assigned to a subsidiary and a lack of scrutiny existed of such work.

== Management ==
In 2014, Tetsuro Aikawa was appointed as the president of the company, becoming the first in more than a decade to have spent an entire career at the company. The career of Aikawa had been mainly in product development, although he was involved in manufacturing and Japan domestic sales lately. Osamu Masuko, the previous president, joined the company from Mitsubishi Corp. in 2004. MMC endured eight presidents between 1989 and 2004.

== Electric vehicles ==
Mitsubishi Motors started selling its i MiEV, the all-electric minicar with a lithium-ion battery pack tucked under its floor, to retail customers in the summer 2009, a year ahead of schedule. The automaker had initially planned to start leasing the minicar-based vehicle to businesses and municipalities in the summer 2009 and to wait until 2010 for the retail launch. It has also announced its plans to offer five other e-drive vehicles.

== Motorsport ==
Mitsubishi Motors has over half a century of international motorsport experience, antedating even the incorporation of MMC. Beginning with street races in the early 1960s, the company found itself gravitating towards the challenge of off-road racing. It dominated endurance rallies in the 1970s, the Dakar Rally from the '80s, and the Group A and Group N classes of the World Rally Championship through the 1990s. Ralliart (later Mitsubishi Motors Motor Sports), was Mitsubishi's racing subsidiary, although the company ceased competing formally in 2010.

=== Circuit racing ===
Mitsubishi Motors's motorsport debut was in touring car racing in 1962, when it entered its Mitsubishi 500 Super DeLuxe in the Macau Grand Prix in an effort to promote sales of its first postwar passenger car. In an auspicious debut, the diminutive rear-engined sedan swept the top four places in the "Under 750 cc" category, with Kazuo Togawa taking class honours. The company returned the following year with its new Mitsubishi Colt 600 and again swept the podium with a 1–2–3 in the "Under 600 cc" class. In its final year of competition with touring cars in 1966, Mitsubishi scored a podium clean sweep in the "750–1000 cc" class of the 1964 Japanese Grand Prix with the Colt 1000, its first front-engined competition vehicle.

The company began concentrating on the Japanese GP's emerging open-wheel "formula car" categories from 1966, winning the "Exhibition" class. They also scored class 1–2 in 1967 and 1968, and reached the podium in 1969 and 1970. They finished on a high with an overall 1–2 in the 1971 Japan GP, with the two litre DOHC F2000 driven by Kuniomi Nagamatsu.

=== Off-road racing ===
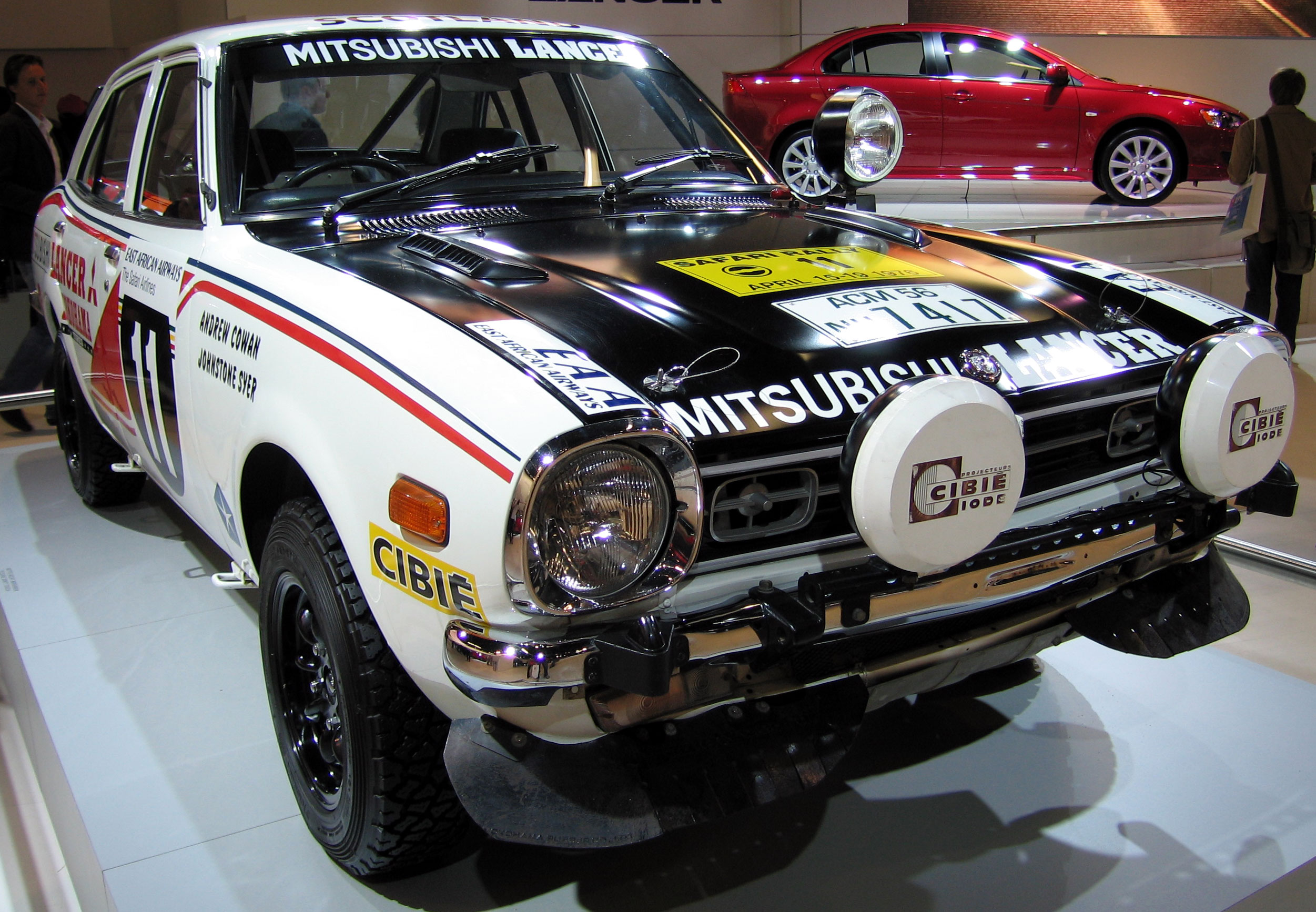
Mitsubishi Lancer 1600 GSR.

The East African Safari Rally was by far the most gruelling event on the World Rally Championship calendar in the 1970s. MMC developed the Lancer 1600 GSR specifically for the marathon race, and won at the first attempt in 1974. Their highpoint was a clean sweep of the podium places in 1976 in an event where only 20% of the starters typically reached the finish. They also achieved a 1–2–3–4 in the 1973 Southern Cross Rally, the first of four consecutive victories in this event with drivers Andrew Cowan and Kenjiro Shinozuka.

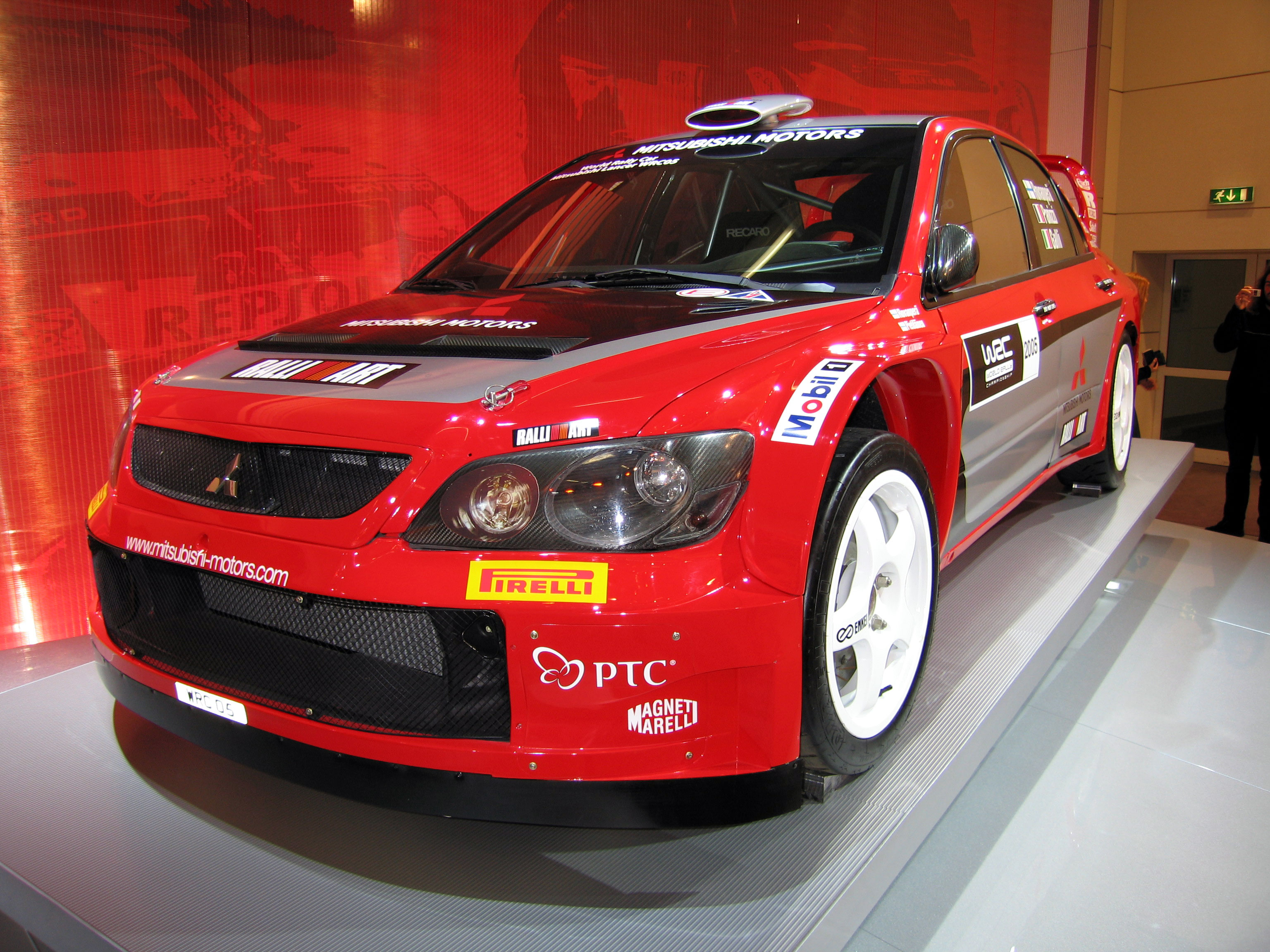
Mitsubishi Lancer WRC05.

During the 1980s, Mitsubishi continued to participate in the WRC, first with the Lancer EX2000 Turbo and the Starion. It then scored its first outright Group A victories with a Galant VR-4 in the late '80s, Mitsubishi homologated the Lancer Evolution, and in the hands of Finland's Tommi Mäkinen, winner of the drivers' title for four consecutive years (1996–1999), it won the manufacturers' championship in 1998. They have won 34 WRC events since 1973. The Lancer Evo has also dominated the FIA championship for showroom-ready cars, winning seven consecutive Group N titles with four different drivers from 1995 to 2001. Even in 2002, when it ostensibly lost the title, the class-winning manufacturer was Proton using a Lancer Evo-based Pert.

Mitsubishi Motors is also the most successful manufacturer in the history of the Dakar Rally. MMC's maiden entry was in 1983 with its new Pajero, and only three attempts were needed to find a winning formula. Since then, it has won in 1992, 1993, 1997, 1998, and between 2001 and 2007, an unprecedented seven consecutive victories and 12th overall with nine different drivers. They also won the 2003 FIA Cross-Country Rally World Cup, along with Carlos Sousa.

== Partnership with Jackie Chan ==
Mitsubishi Motors has had a 30-year-long association with actor Jackie Chan, who has used its vehicles almost exclusively in his movies throughout his career. The Jackie Chan Cup, first held in 1984, is an annual celebrity auto race involving international motor journalists and starlets from across Asia in Mitsubishis with professional touring car drivers alongside for assistance, and was held before the Macau GP until 2004, when it moved to Shanghai. In September 2005 Ralliart, Mitsubishi's motorsport arm, produced 50 Jackie Chan Special Edition versions of the Lancer Evo IX; Chan acts as the honorary director of Team Ralliart China.

== Locations ==
Top 10 Mitsubishi Motors vehicle sales by country, 2018
Rank	Location	Vehicle sales
1	Indonesia	146,805
2	China	139,856
3	United States	118,075
4	Japan	104,611
5	Australia	84,826
6	Thailand	84,560
7	Philippines	65,894
8	Germany	52,196
9	Russia	45,391
10	United Kingdom	30,952

The company has vehicle manufacturing facilities in Japan, the Philippines, Thailand, and Indonesia, and 12 plants co-owned in partnership with others. In Brazil, it has a production agreement with a local group with no direct investment from MMC. It also has three further engine and transmission manufacturing plants, five R&D centres, and 75 subsidiaries, affiliates, and partners. Its vehicles are manufactured, assembled, or sold in more than 160 countries worldwide.

=== Research, design, and administration ===
Japan

- Minato, Tokyo: Head Office and Tokyo Design Studio
- Okazaki, Aichi: Car Research & Development Center
- Uzumasa, Ukyō, Kyoto: Car Research and Development Center
- Hokkaido: Car Research & Development Center, Tokachi Proving Ground
- Mitsubishi Auto Gallery (三菱オートギャラリー), 1, Nakashinkiri, Okazaki

Worldwide

- Trebur, Hessen, Germany: Mitsubishi Motor R&D of Europe GmbH (MRDE)
- Ann Arbor, Michigan, United States: Mitsubishi Motors R&D of America, Inc. (MRDA) Head Office
- Cypress, California, United States: Mitsubishi Motors R&D of America, Inc. (MRDA) Research and Design Center

=== Production facilities ===
Japan

- Okazaki, Aichi: Okazaki Plant (previously Nagoya Plant)
- Kurashiki, Okayama: Mizushima Vehicle & Powertrain Plant
- Uzumasa, Ukyō, Kyoto: Powertrain plant
- Koka, Shiga: Powertrain plant

Worldwide

- Santa Rosa, Laguna, Philippines: Mitsubishi Motors Philippines Corp. (MMPC)
- Calamba, Laguna, Philippines: Asian Transmission Corp. (ATC)
- Laem Chabang, Thailand: Mitsubishi Motors (Thailand) Co., Ltd. (MMTh)
- Laem Chabang, Thailand: MMTh Engine Co., Ltd. (MEC)
- Cikarang, West Java, Indonesia: PT Mitsubishi Motors Krama Yudha Indonesia (MMKI)
- Di An, Binh Duong Province, Vietnam: Mitsubishi Motors Vietnam Co., Ltd. (MMV)
- Catalão, Brazil: MMC Automotores do Brasil Ltda

Former production facilities

- Sakahogi, Gifu: Pajero Manufacturing Co., Ltd. Closed in 2021.
- Ooe, Nagoya: Vehicle production plant closed in 2001 after MMC’s major safety scandal and the following financial losses. Sold later on to Mitsubishi Heavy Industries.
- China: South East (Fujian) Motor Co., Ltd. (SEM). Mitsubishi sold its 25% stake in 2021.
- Tonsley Park, South Australia, Australia (1981–2008)
- Tanjung Priok, Jakarta, Indonesia: PT. Krama Yudha Kesuma Motor (KKM), 1981–2005.
- Born, Netherlands: Netherlands Car B.V. (NedCar), shares sold in 2012 to VDL Groep.
- Normal, Illinois, United States: Mitsubishi Motors North America, Inc (MMNA). Opened in 1988, closed in 2015. Sold to Rivian in 2017.
- China: GAC Mitsubishi Motors Co., Ltd. (GMMC)
- Barcelona, Anzoátegui, Venezuela: (MMC Automotriz S.A.) Opened in 1990, sold to Grupo Sylca (a.k.a. Grupo Yammine) in 2015.
- Kaluga, Russia: Peugeot Citroën Mitsubishi Automotiv Rus (PCMA Rus), joint venture with PSA Peugeot Citroën, now part of Stellantis, ceased production in April 2022.

== Leadership ==
- Yuji Sato (1970–1973)
- Tomio Kubo (1973–1979)
- Yoshitoshi Sone (1979–1981)
- Masao Suzuki (1981–1983)
- Toyoo Tate (1983–1989)
- Hirokazu Nakamura (1989–1995)
- Nobuhisa Tsukamura (1995–1996)
- Takemune Kimura (1996–1997)
- Katsuhiko Kawasoe (1997–2000)
- Takashi Sonobe (2000–2002)
- Rolf Eckrodt (2002–2004)
- Yoichiro Okazaki (2004)
- Hideyasu Tagaya (2004–2005)
- Osamu Masuko (2005–2020)
- Takao Kato (2020–present)

== See also ==
- Urawa Red Diamonds
- Mitsubishi Motors Mizushima F.C.
- Automotive industry in Japan
- List of Mitsubishi Motors vehicles
