= Mitsunari =

Mitsunari is a Japanese name that may refer to:

- Ishida Mitsunari (1559–1600), Japanese samurai and military commander
- Mitsunari Musaka (born 1991), Japanese footballer
- Mitsunari Okamoto (born 1965), Japanese politician
- Mitsunari Kanai (1939–2004), Japanese aikido and iaido teacher

== See also ==
- Mitsunori
