= Takao Kato (businessman) =

Japanese business executive (born 1962)

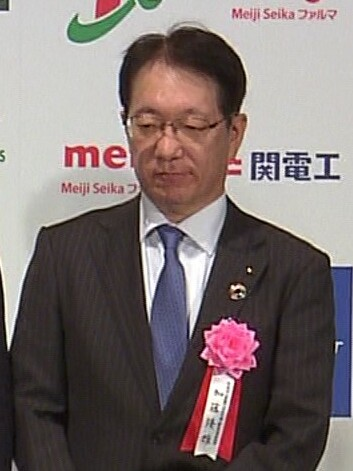
- Kato in March 2022
- Born: February 21, 1962 (age 64); Tsu, Mie, Japan
- Education: Kyoto University
- Occupation: Businessperson

Takao Kato (加藤 隆雄, Katō Takao; born February 21, 1962) is a Japanese business executive in the automotive industry. He works for Mitsubishi Motors, as CEO and president since 2019 and 2021 respectively.

== Biography ==
Kato was born in Tsu, Mie on February 21, 1962. After graduating from the Faculty of Engineering at Kyoto University in 1984, he joined Mitsubishi Motors.

After working as deputy general manager of Nagoya Works and president of Mitsubishi Motors Indonesia, Kato was appointed as representative director and CEO in June 2019. In addition from these two positions, he was appointed president on an interim basis in 2020, and permanently in April 2021.
