= Ryuji Kimura =

Japanese baseball player

Ryuji Kimura 木村 龍治
- Pitcher / Coach
- Born: September 1, 1970 (age 55); Nagoya, Aichi
- Batted: Right Threw: Right

NPB debut
- June 11, 1993, for the Yomiuri Giants

Last appearance
- July 30, 2003, for the Yomiuri Giants

NPB statistics (through 2004)
- Win–loss: 10-5
- ERA: 4.21
- Strikeouts: 124
- Stats at Baseball Reference

Teams
- As player: Yomiuri Giants (1993–2004); As coach: Yomiuri Giants (2005–2019); Chiba Lotte Marines (2022)

Ryuji Kimura (木村 龍治, Kimura Ryūji; born September 1, 1970 in Nagoya, Aichi, Japan) is a Japanese former Nippon Professional Baseball pitcher.
