= Umejiro Kimura =

- Born: 16 December 1869
- Died: 8 November 1927 (aged 57)
- Occupation: philatelist

Umejiro Kimura (Kyoto, 16 December 1869 – 8 November 1927) was a Japanese philatelist who was entered on the Roll of Distinguished Philatelists in 1921. He was the Editor of The Yuraku, the first philatelic journal in Japan. He was also the President of the Yurakukai (Philatelic Society of Japan).

== Publications ==
- Dainihon Yubinkitte Ruikan (The Standard Catalogue of Postage Stamps of Japan). Tokyo. Fifth edition 1925.
