= Mitsunori Miki =

Japanese engineer, professor, and writer (born 1950)

Mitsunori Miki (三木 光範, Miki Mitsunori, born 1950) is a Japanese engineer, professor, and writer. Since 1994 he has been a professor at Doshisha University, where he oversees the Intelligent System Design Laboratory (ISDL). He received his graduate degree from Osaka University in 1978. In addition to his academic research on parallel computing and intelligent systems, he has written opinion columns for Sankei Shimbun on education, technology, and employment.
