= 1993 Japan rugby union tour of Argentina =

1993 Japan National Rugby Union Tour

Summary
P	W	D	L
Total
5	3	0	2
Test match
2	0	0	2
Opponent
P	W	D	L
Argentina
2	0	0	2

The 1993 Japan rugby union tour of Argentina was a series of matches played in May 1993 in Argentina by Japan national rugby union team.

== Results ==
Scores and results list South Japan's points tally first.

Opposing Team	For	Against	Date	Venue	Status
Combinado Regional del Sur	55	6	May 8, 1993	Marabunta RC, Cipolletti	Tour match
Entre Rios	42	38	May 11, 1993	Entre Rios, Paraná E.R.	Tour match
Argentina	27	30	May 15, 1993	Tucuman	Test Match
Combinado Regional del Norte	92	28	May 19, 1993	Santiago TC, Santiago del Estero	Tour match
Argentina	20	45	May 22, 1993	Ferro Carril Oeste, Buenos Aires'	Test Match
