= Kenichi Kimura (rugby union) =

Japan international rugby union player

- Born: 29 December 1968 (age 57) Osaka, Japan
- University: Osaka University of Health and Sports Studies; Meiji University

Rugby union career
- Position: Prop
Amateur team(s)
Years	Team	Apps	(Points)
1983	Meiji University RFC		
Senior career
Years	Team	Apps	(Points)
1991-2000	Toyota		
International career
Years	Team	Apps	(Points)
1991-1996	Japan	1	(0)

Kenichi Kimura (木村 賢一, Kimura Ken'ichi; born 18 February 1968 in Osaka) is a former rugby union footballer who played for Japan. He played as a prop.

== Career ==
He was part of the Japanese national team during the 1991 Rugby World Cup, the 1993 Japan rugby union tour of Argentina and the 1993 Japan rugby union tour of Wales, but his debut as full international, which was also his last match, was against Canada in Tokyo, on 9 June 1996.
