= Shioko Kimura =

Japanese-American biochemist

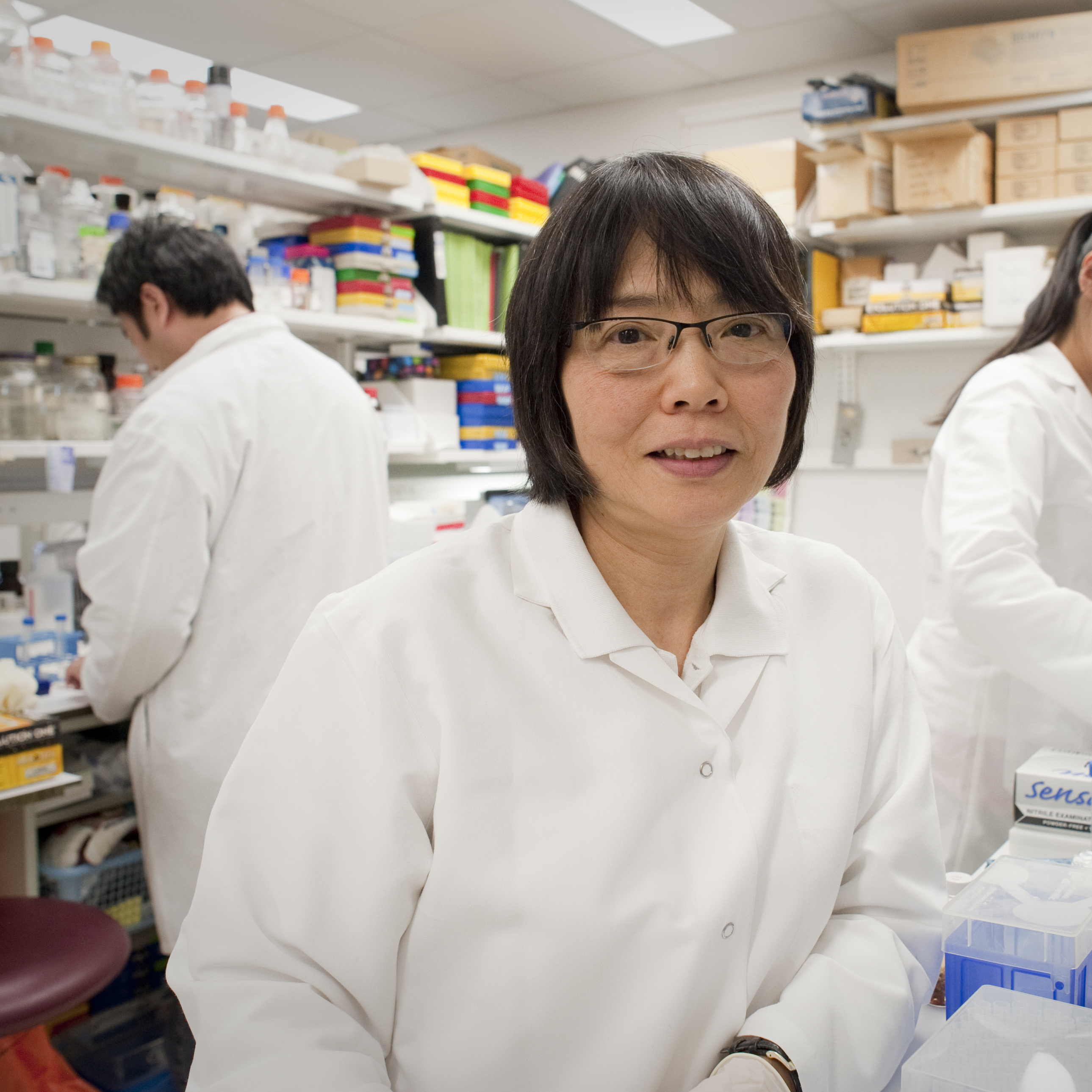
- Citizenship: United States
- Education: Hokkaido University (PhD)
- Scientific career
- Fields: Biochemistry, endocrinology, cancer research
- Workplaces: National Cancer Institute

Shioko Kimura is a Japanese-American biochemist specialized in endocrinology and the physiology and pathogenesis of diseases including thyroid and lung cancers. She headed the endocrinology section in the laboratory of metabolism at the National Cancer Institute until her retirement in 2025.

== Early life and education ==
Kimura completed a Ph.D. in chemistry at Hokkaido University. She was a postdoctoral researcher at Queen's University at Kingston and a visiting fellow at the Eunice Kennedy Shriver National Institute of Child Health and Human Development (NICHD).

== Career ==
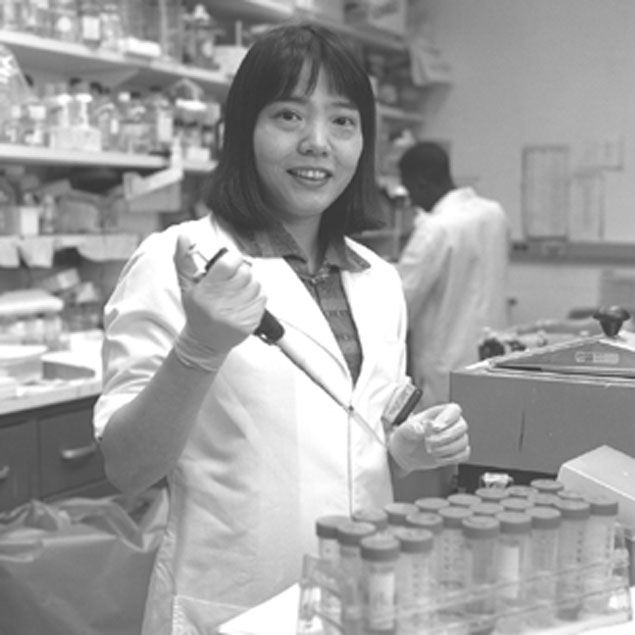
Kimura at NCI

At the National Cancer Institute (NCI), she started in the laboratory of molecular carcinogenesis. Since 1996, she heads the endocrinology section in the laboratory of metabolism.

Kimura's research focuses on understanding the role of homeodomain transcription factor NKX2-1, a marker for lung adenocarcinoma in humans, and its downstream target, a novel cytokine, SCGB3A2 in development, homeostasis, physiology, and pathogenesis of diseases, particularly cancers of the thyroid and lung. Kimura uses cell culture and mouse models, and various genetically engineered mouse lines to investigate these problems. Her studies have suggested that SCGB3A2 has anti-cancer activity, and her group is currently extensively involved in uncovering the mechanism. Throughout her career, Kimura served on editorial boards, edited and reviewed for various journals and grants, and participated on numerous NCI and NIH committees.

Kimura retired on June 30, 2025.

== Publications ==
- Yokoyama, S; Cai, Y; Murata, M; Tomita, T; Yoneda, M; Xu, L; Pilon, AL; Cachau, RE; Kimura, S (2018). "A novel pathway of LPS uptake through syndecan-1 leading to pyroptotic cell death". eLife. 7 e37854. doi:10.7554/eLife.37854. PMC 6286126. PMID 30526845.
- Iwadate, M; Takizawa, Y; Shirai, YT; Kimura, S (2018). "An in vivo model for thyroid regeneration and folliculogenesis". Lab Invest. 98 (9): 1126–1132. doi:10.1038/s41374-018-0068-x. PMC 6138525. PMID 29946134.
- Kido, T; Yoneda, M; Cai, Y; Matsubara, T; Ward, JM; Kimura, S (2014). "Secretoglobin superfamily protein SCGB3A2 deficiency potentiates ovalbumin-induced allergic pulmonary inflammation". Mediators Inflamm. 2014 216465. doi:10.1155/2014/216465. PMC 4163287. PMID 25242865.
- Cai, Y; Winn, ME; Zehmer, JK; Gillette, WK; Lubkowski, JT; Pilon, AL; Kimura, S (2014). "Preclinical evaluation of human secretoglobin 3A2 in mouse models of lung development and fibrosis". Am J Physiol Lung Cell Mol Physiol. 306 (1): L10-22. doi:10.1152/ajplung.00037.2013. PMC 3920213. PMID 24213919.
- Snyder, EL; Watanabe, H; Magendantz, M; Hoersch, S; Chen, TA; Wang, DG; Crowley, D; Whittaker, CA; Meyerson, M; Kimura, S; Jacks, T (2013). "Nkx2-1 represses a latent gastric differentiation program in lung adenocarcinoma". Mol Cell. 50 (2): 185–99. doi:10.1016/j.molcel.2013.02.018. PMC 3721642. PMID 23523371.
