= Mitsunori Kimura =

Japanese artist (born 1983)

Mitsunori Kimura 木村充伯
- Born: 1983; Shizuoka Precfecture, Japan
- Occupation: Japanese artist

Mitsunori Kimura (木村充伯, Kimura Mitsunori, born 1983 in Shizuoka Precfecture, Japan) is a Japanese artist. He lives and works in Shizuoka, though his artwork has been exhibited Seoul, Florence, Valencia, Luxembourg. Kimura is represented in Tokyo and Nagoya by Kenji Taki Gallery.

== Artwork ==
Kimura is a sculptor creates works by wood carving and oil paint modeling. He picks up the motifs of his works from daily moments of humor and unexpected intimacy.

== Background and education ==
Mitsunori Kimura was born in Shizuoka, Japan in 1983. Kimura received his B.F.A. (2005) and an M.F.A. (2007) from the Nagoya Zokei University of Arts and Design. In 2013, Kimura had been selected to participating in Asia-Pacific Fellowship Program at National Art Studio, Changdong – National Museum of Contemporary Art, Seoul.

== Solo exhibitions ==
- LOVE (2019, Kenji Taki Gallery, Tokyo, Japan)
- There is No Ape Here (2018, Do a Front, Yamaguchi, Japan)
- Wonderful Days (2017, Kenji Taki Gallery, Tokyo, Japan)
- We Mammals (2016, Kenji Taki Gallery, Nagoya, Japan)
- Wonderful Man (2015, Gallery Kiche, Seoul, Korea)
- Above the horizon (2014, Kenji Taki Gallery, Nagoya, Japan)
- Double Story (2013, Kenji Taki Gallery, Tokyo, Japan)
- Mitsunori Kimura (2011, Kenji Taki Gallery, Tokyo, Japan)
- Mitsunori Kimura – the cat's sleeping pattern (2013, curated by Fumiko Nakamura, Social Kitchen, Kyoto, Japan)
- The Man Absorbing Oil (2010, Kenji Taki Gallery, Nagoya, Japan)

== Selected group exhibitions ==
- Aichi Art Chronicle 1919-2019 (2019, Aichi Prefectural Museum of Art, Nagoya, Japan)
- trans_2018-2019 AiR Overseas Dispatch Program (2019, Akiyoshidai International Art Village, Yamaguchi, Japan)
- Before Form (2018, Gallery Kiche, Seoul, Korea)
- Festival GCC (2018, Gyeonggi Creation Center, Ansan, Korea)
- Rendez-vous, Biennale de Lyon 2017 (2017, Institut d'art contemporain, Villeurbanne, France)
- Black, Color – Mitsunori Kimura and Ru Yi Tan (2017, Art Lab Aichi, Nagoya, Japan)
- 6th Exhibition AGAIN-st Peaceful Sculpture (2017, NADiff Gallery, Tokyo, Japan)
- Enokojima Art Days 2017 Other Ways (2017, Enoco, Osaka, Japan)
- Navigation & Trajectory (2015, Aomori Contemporary Art Centre, Aomori, Japan)
- Tails (2014, Gallery Kiche, Seoul, Korea)
- Koganecho Bazaar 2014 (2014, Koganecho Area, Yokohama, Japan)
- Convocatoria Internacional annual de jovenes artistas – XV Edición (2013, Luis Adelantado Valencia, Valencia, Spain)
- Seoul Seoul Seoul (2013, National Art Studio, Changdong – National Museum of Modern and Contemporary Art, Korea, Seoul, Korea)
- il dio delle piccole cose (The god of small things) (2009, curated by Pier Luigi Tazzi, Casa Masaccio / centro per l’arte contemporanea, San Giovanni Valdarno, Italy)
- City_net Asia 2007 (curated by Masahiko Haito, Seoul Museum of Art, Seoul, Korea)
