= Takemune Kimura =

Japanese businessman (1931–2006)

Takemune Kimura (木村 雄宗, Kimura Takemune; February 10, 1931 – February 14, 2006) was a Japanese businessman and former president of Mitsubishi Motors. Prior to his promotion in June 1995 he spent 37 years at the company's Mizushima manufacturing facility in Kurashiki, Okayama, before becoming president of the Pajero Manufacturing Co. subsidiary in Sakahogi, Gifu. He was hired to replace the outgoing Nobuhisa Tsukahara, who was retiring due to health problems. Soon after taking the post, he outlined a long term strategy for expansion by introducing a wider range of vehicles, and to undercut competitors by focusing on low cost manufacturing.

He and chairman Hirokazu Nakamura were forced to resign in December 1997, after four former company executives were jailed for making corporate payoffs to sōkaiya racketeers. Mitsubishi Motors admitted to paying ¥23.5 million to the wife of a racketeer, ostensibly for the rental of a beach house, in a controversy which also engulfed Toshiba and Hitachi.

He was among those former executives named in 2005 in a ¥1.3 billion lawsuit filed by Mitsubishi Motors in connection with the Mitsubishi Motors recall cover up scandal, but died of bile duct cancer in 2006 before the case was resolved.
