= Tenkaippin =

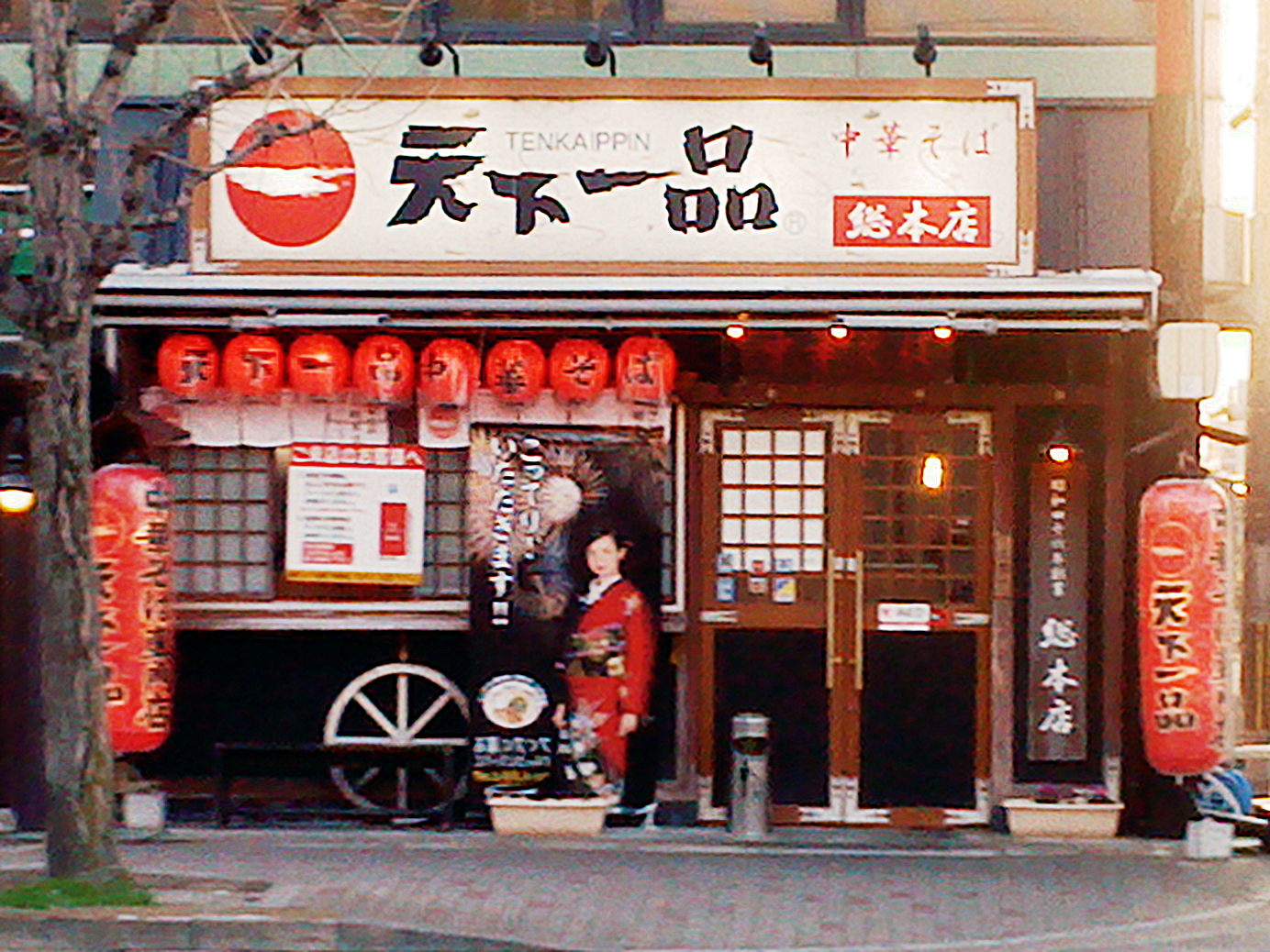
- The first Tenkaippin store in Sakyō-ku, Kyoto

Restaurant information
- Established: November 16, 1981; 44 years ago
- Owner: Tsutomu Kimura
- Food type: Ramen
- Location: Japan
- Other locations: 233 nationwide
- Other information: Franchise chain restaurant

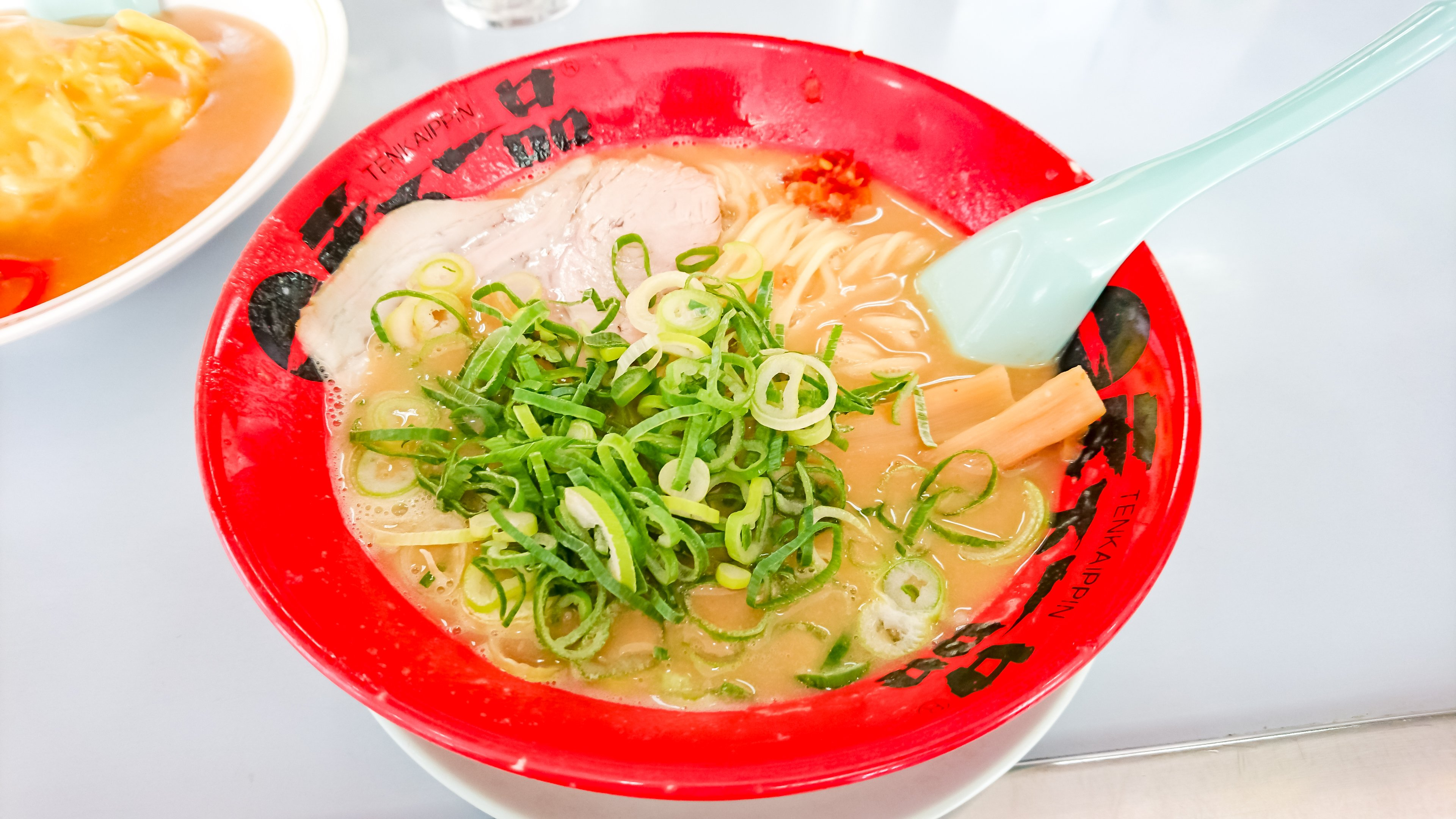
A bowl of Tenkaippin ramen

Tenkaippin (天下一品) is a Japanese restaurant chain specializing in ramen noodles. The first restaurant was opened in Kyoto by Tsutomu Kimura in 1981. As of December 2014, there are 233 branches in 38 of Japan's prefectures. On December 8, 2025, a branch was opened in Little Tokyo, Los Angeles. The chain is often known by its short name Ten'ichi (天一). Tenkaippin holds a special promotion every October 1, which they call Ten'ichi Day (天一の日, Ten'ichi no Hi), playing off of the name of their restaurant and the calendar date.

== Controversies ==
In October 2012, Tenkaippin was involved in a lawsuit over failure to pay a resort in Ōtsu, Shiga, for its appearance in one of their television commercials, with the resort demanding ¥18 million, which Tenkaippin refused to pay.

In January 2014, 18 stores across the country revealed that they had been serving Chinese-grown scallion at their restaurants rather than the "Kujo Negi" scallion native to Kyoto, and the franchisee publicly apologized for the mix-up.
