= Ken-ichi Kimura (architect) =

Japanese environmental architect (born 1933)

Ken-ichi Kimura (木村 建一, Kimura Ken-ichi) (born 1933, Fushun, China) is a Japanese environmental architect.

Kimura's main interests lie in sustainable architecture and engineering. In 1972, he designed a solar-heated house for his family, which attracted public attention after the oil crisis of 1973. Since then, he has designed several more solar houses and conducted studies on energy conservation in buildings, utilization of natural energy sources, and solar heating and cooling. He has also enjoyed a long career in academia, and has authored a variety of publications.

Kimura is the father of Mari Kimura, a Japanese violinist and composer in New York.

== Education and employment ==
Kimura studied architecture and building science at Waseda University in Tokyo, graduating in 1957 with a bachelor's degree in Architecture. He stayed at the university to complete a master's degree in science, graduating in 1959. Then he joined the Solar Energy Project, and, from 1960–62, he worked as a research assistant at the Massachusetts Institute of Technology (MIT) through the Fulbright Program, with Prof. Lawrence B. Anderson as his adviser.

After leaving MIT, he returned to Waseda University's Department of Architecture. There he worked on some architectural research projects, and obtained a doctorate in engineering in 1965.

From 1967-69, Kimura worked as a post-doctoral fellow at the Canadian National Research Council's Division of Building Research in Ottawa, Ontario, Canada. There he worked on developing the use of computers in environmental engineering, particularly in relation to regulating buildings' heating and cooling loads.

Kimura taught at Waseda University in various positions since 1964. From 1964-67, he was an assistant professor. In 1967, he graduated to the position of associate professor, and remained in that position for six years. He was made a full professor in 1973 and taught in that capacity until 1999, when he retired as a professor emeritus. At that point, he left the Department of Architecture and became a professor at Waseda's Advanced Research Institute for Science and Engineering.

== Awards ==
- Research Paper Award, Society of Heating, Air-Conditioning and Sanitary Engineering of Japan, 1968, 1972, 1973
- Research Paper Award, Architectural Institute of Japan, 1982
- PLEA (Passive and Low Energy Architecture) Award, 1997
- Farrington Daniels Award, International Solar Energy Society, 1999

== Membership in academic societies ==
=== Membership on Boards of Directors ===
- The Architectural Institute of Japan (1981–82)
- The International Relations Committee (1972–73, 1975–76, 1978, 1987-88)
  - Served as chairman from 1979 to 1981 and from 1992 to 1994
- The American Society of Heating, Air-Conditioning and Refrigerating Engineers (1974-1980)
  - Served as chairman of the organization's Japanese section from 1984 to 1987

=== Other leadership positions ===
- The Society of Heating, Air Conditioning and Sanitary Engineers of Japan
  - Vice president, 1980–82; president, 1994–96
- The International Solar Energy Society
  - Vice president, 1975–84; president, 1984–86
- The International Academy of Indoor Air Science
  - Steering committee member, 1988–91; member of the Directorate, 1990–93
- Honorary president of NPO Environmental House
  - He also served as treasurer from 1994–97

== Participation in international conferences ==
Kimura has served as Chairman or vice-chairman of the organizing committees for various international conferences, including:

- International Symposium on Thermal Application of Solar Energy, 1985, Hakone, Japan (vice-chairman)
- World Solar Energy Congress, 1989, Kobe, Japan (Chairman)
- 7th International Conference on PLEA, 1989, Nara, Japan (vice-chairman)
- 10th International Conference of PLEA, 1992, Auckland, New Zealand (Chairman)
- 7th International Conference on Indoor Air Quality and Climate (INDOOR AIR 96), 1996, Nagoya, Japan (chairman)

He has also been a member of the international advisory committee for many international conferences.

== Design projects ==
Kimura has collaborated and consulted on a number of design projects, including:

- The Kimura Solar House (Tokorozawa, Saitama), 1972
- An Experimental Solar House for the Science and Technology Agency (Souka, Saitama), 1974
- Chiba Solar House (Kamakura, Kanazawa), 1976
- Sagara Solar House (Inagi, Tokyo), 1979
- Suzuki Solar House (Oyama, Tochigi), 1979
- Kusano Solar House (Yokohama, Kanazawa), 1981
- Miki Solar House (Setagaya, Tokyo), 1982
- Takasaki Clinic and Solar House (Nerima, Tokyo), 1983
- TEPCO Passive Solar House (Shinagawa, Tokyo), 1988
- Creatopia Collective Solar Houses (Obuse, Nagano), 1978
- Solar Building of the Department of Energy Engineering at Oita University by Sunshine Project, MITI (Oita City, Oita), 1975
- Hirakata Solar House by Sunshine Project, MITI (Hirakata, Osaka), 1975
- Japanese Advanced Solar House IV-NA21 (Nasu, Tochigi), 1994
- Building for the Faculty of Environmental Engineering, Kitakyushu University (Kitakyushu, Fukuoka), 1999

== Publications ==
- Fundamental Theories of Building Services, Gakkensha, 1970
- Environmental Engineering (Building Technology Series No.2), Shoukokusha, 1976
- Scientific Basis of Air Conditioning, Applied Science Publishers, London, 1977
- Introduction to Solar Houses, Omusha, 1980
- Theories of Solar Energy (New Architectural Science Series No.8), Shoukokusha, 1984
- Space Cooling and Heating Load Calculation (Handbook of Air-Conditioning and Sanitary Engineering, 10th Edition, Chapter 2 of Volume 5), Society of Heating, Air-Conditioning and Sanitary Engineers of Japan, 1981
- Pocket Book of Architectural Glossary – Environment and Building Services, Maruzen, 1986 (editor)
- Theories of Architectural Environment, Vol. 1, Maruzen, 1991 (editor)
- Theories of Architectural Environment, Vol. 2, Maruzen, 1992 (editor, co-author)
- Natural Energy Technologies of Vernacular Architecture, 1999 (editor, co-author)
- Glossary of House Environment, Sokokusha, 2003
- Scientific Basis of Air Conditioning (Revised Version), Building Research Institute, Japan, 2010
- World Journey of Environmental Architecture, IRIHE, Japan, 2013
- Essay on Architectural Environment, IRIHE, Japan, 2013
