= Mitsubishi Motors Brasil =

- Company type: Subsidiary
- Founded: 1991; 35 years ago
- Headquarters: Fortaleza, Ceará
- Products: Automobile manufacturing
- Parent: Mitsubishi Motors (100%)
- Website: www.mitsubishimotors.com.br

Mitsubishi Motors Brasil, known officially as MMC Automóveis do Brasil Ltda., is the Brazilian operation of Mitsubishi Motors. Since its inauguration, it has sold more than 200 thousand vehicles in Brazil and now has an annual turnover of around R$ 4 billion, being one of the 100 largest companies in the country.

== History ==
In 1991, Mitsubishi Motors do Brasil (MMCB) was one of the first automakers to arrive in the country after the opening of imports. Six years later, in 1997, the company laid the foundation stone for its industrial unit in Catalão, southeastern Goiás. At this moment, the brand of the three diamonds started a new trajectory, ceasing to be a representative, to become the first automobile factory. in the country with 100% national capital and also the first to settle in the Central-West region.

On 15 July 1998, the first white Mitsubishi L200, with the typical Brazilian morphology, left the assembly line: double cab, diesel engine and 4-wheel drive. With 14,000 m² of built area and 150 employees, five vehicles were produced per day.

In 2000, Mitsubishi launched the Anhanguera I project. In the first phase, four production processes were verticalized - welding, pre-treatment and body painting and plastic parts - and the launch of new products, the Pajero TR4 and the L200 Sport. The built area increased to 44 thousand m² and the installed capacity increased to 30 thousand units per year, in two production lines. The body welding area and the materials warehouse were also expanded.

In the second phase of the project, from 2004 to 2006, Mitsubishi invested in the expansion of the factory, which now has 65 thousand m². At this time, the Pajero Sport was launched and the number of employees increased from 727 to 1,500.

The third phase of the project, from 2007 to 2009, included a new expansion of the factory. This season marked the launch of the first Flex SUV (Pajero TR4 Flex), the first V6 Flex engine (Pajero Sport Flex) and the first Flex double cabin (L200 Triton Flex). The factory area increased to almost 100 thousand m².

In 2011, Mitsubishi Motors announced and is meeting the schedule for Project Anhanguera II. The program aims at a new expansion of the production capacity of the factory in Catalão, nationalization of imported products (ASX - 2013 and Lancer Sedan - 2014) and launch of new vehicles. There is also a forecast for an engine factory by 2014.

The new projects are expected to create more than 1,000 new jobs and could attract eight to 15 suppliers to the region. Currently, there are 2650 direct employees, responsible for the daily production of 205 vehicles, including the L200 Triton line (L200 Triton HPE, L200 Triton Savana, L200 Triton GLS, L200 Triton GLX and L200 Triton GL), Pajero Dakar and Pajero TR4. For 2012, the goal of selling vehicles, domestic and imported, is 62 thousand cars, and in 2011, sales were 55,516.

== Current production ==
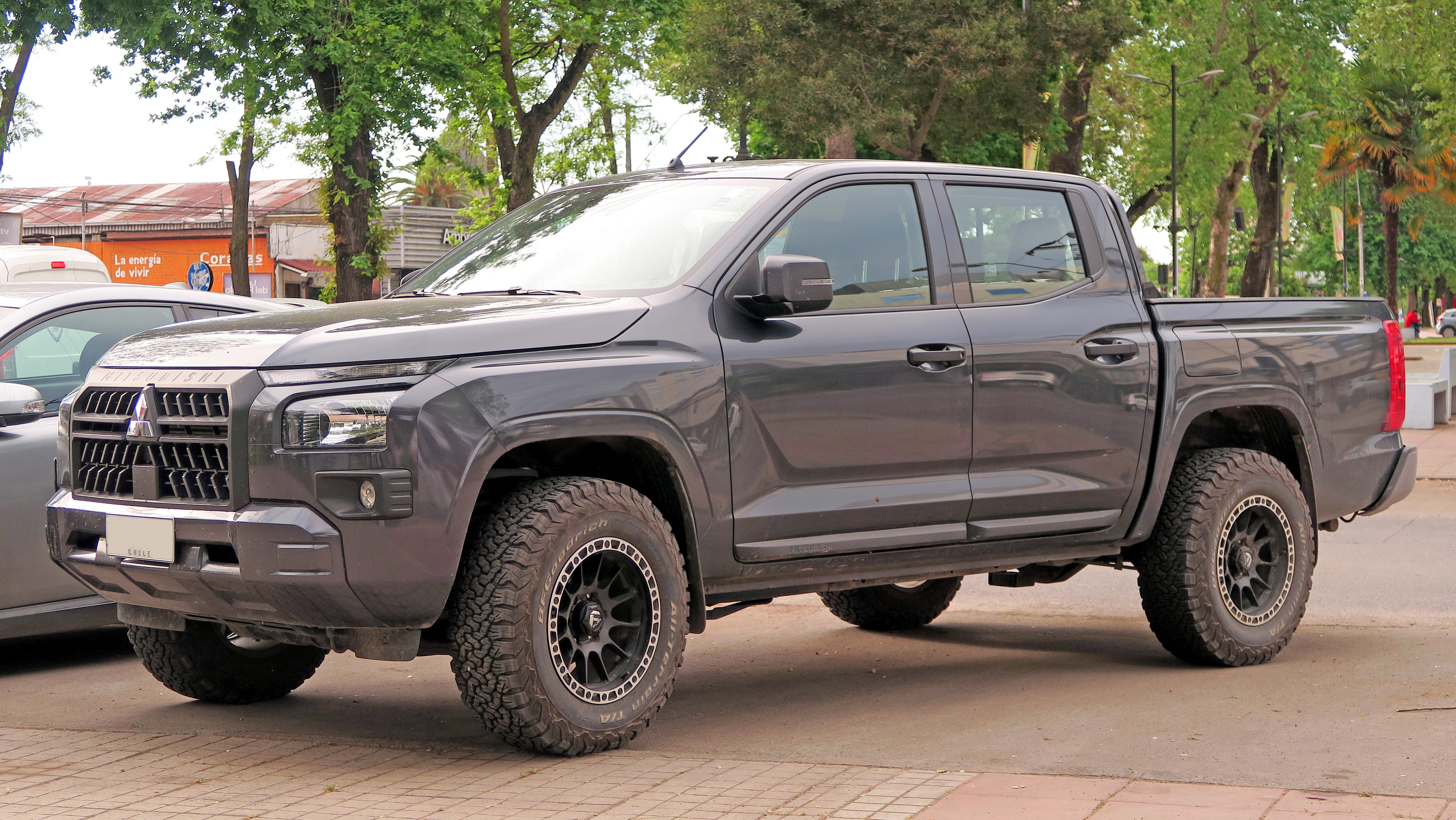
Triton/L200

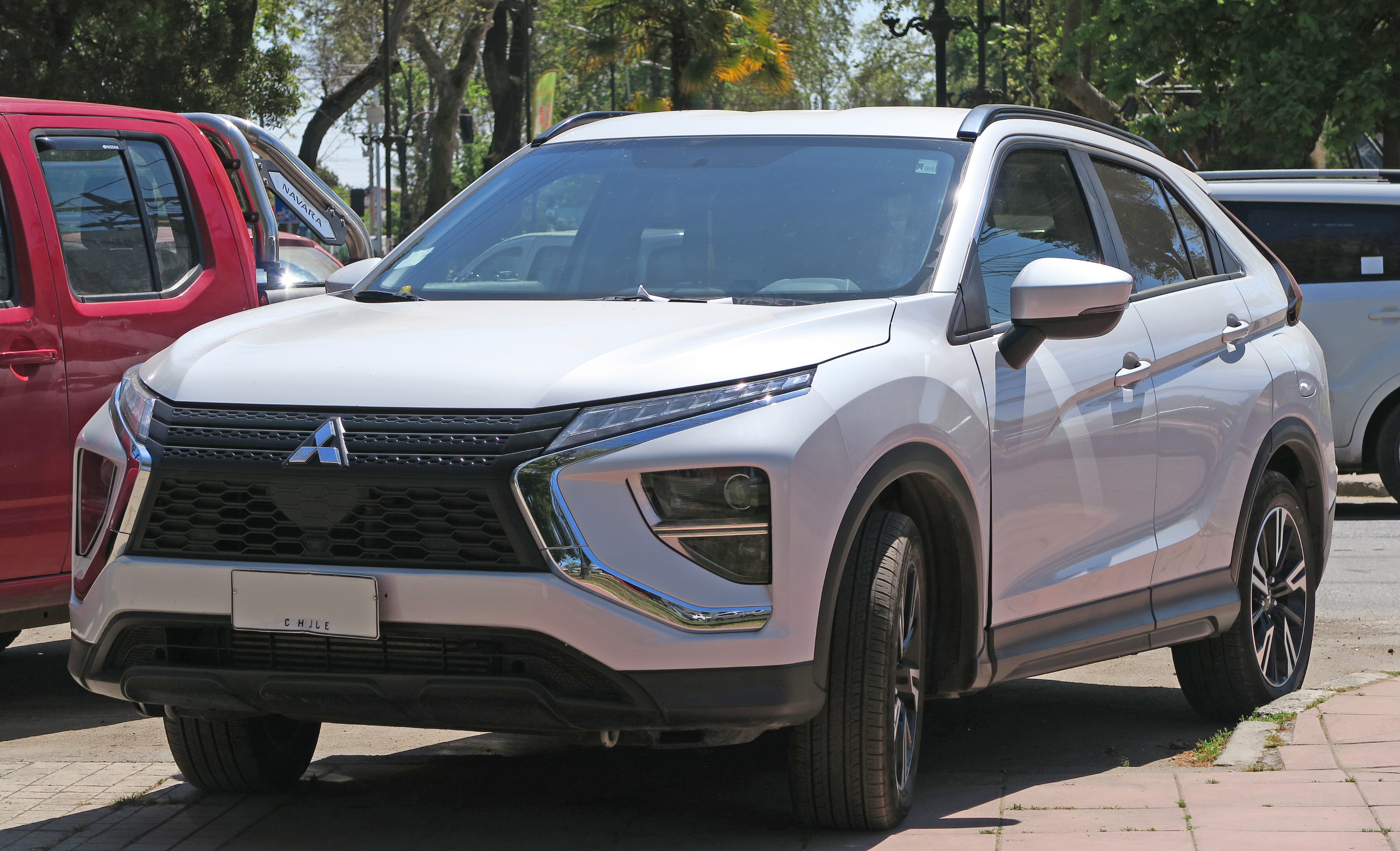
Eclipse Cross

== Rallies ==
In 1994, the first regularity rally in Brazil was created, the Mitsubishi MotorSports, which became a unique experience among off-road lovers and customers of the brand, bringing the Nation 4x4 together on tours in different regions of the country. All editions of the event include the donation of food to charities in the Mitsubishi Pro Brasil action.

In 2000, at the request of competitors looking for more speed, the Mitsubishi Cup was created, a cross country speed rally held in seven stages.

Four years later, in 2004, Mitsubishi Outdoor was created, an unprecedented rally category in Brazil. The team strategy test for family and friends combines regularity rally with sporting and cultural activities.

=== Rally dos Sertões ===
The Rally dos Sertões, one of the most famous in the country, has Mitsubishi as its official sponsor. The circuit, which has already passed to beaches and mountains, is considered a stage of the FIA World Cup for Cross-Country Rallies for cars and trucks.

The 2011 edition of the event marked the brand's tenth victory since the event was created. In the 4,000 km between Goiânia and Fortaleza, the pair of Guilherme Spinelli and Youssef Haddad won with a Lancer Racing.

=== Equipe Mitsubishi Brasil ===
Equipe Mitsubishi Brasil was formed by Spinelli and Haddad. Spinelli is four times champion of the general of the Rally dos Sertões and vice of the gasoline category in the Dakar Rally, among other titles. Haddad, on the other hand, is two times champion of the general category of Rally dos Sertões and champion of Rally RN1500, for example. The pair compete on board the modern Mitsubishi Lancer Racing.

== Mitsubishi Sailing Cup ==
Aiming at encouraging Brazilian sailing, in 2010 the Mitsubishi Sailing Cup was created, a championship for monotypic sailboats of the S40, HPE25 and C30 classes. The disputes are always intense and extremely fierce, the result is defined only in the final moments of the race.

== Autódromo Velo Città ==
The Autódromo Velo Città is Mitsubishi's race track. It is a challenging circuit with 3,430 meters and 3 different routes in Mogi Guaçu, 180 km (110 mi) from São Paulo. The race track is full of peculiarities, such as uphill and downhill and counterclockwise.

The Velo Città circuit is homologated by the CBA (Brazilian Automobile Confederation) with an FIA (Fédération Internationale de l'Automobile) international standard.

== Mitsubishi Café ==
Opened on 4 June 2012, Mitsubishi Café is a sophisticated space within Shopping Cidade Jardim, in São Paulo. The space is exclusive for the brand's customers, who can enjoy, free of charge, various types of coffee by Chocolat du Jour. On site, there is always a Mitsubishi car exhibit and special actions.
