= Mitsubishi Pajero Sport =

Mid-size SUV produced by Mitsubishi Motors

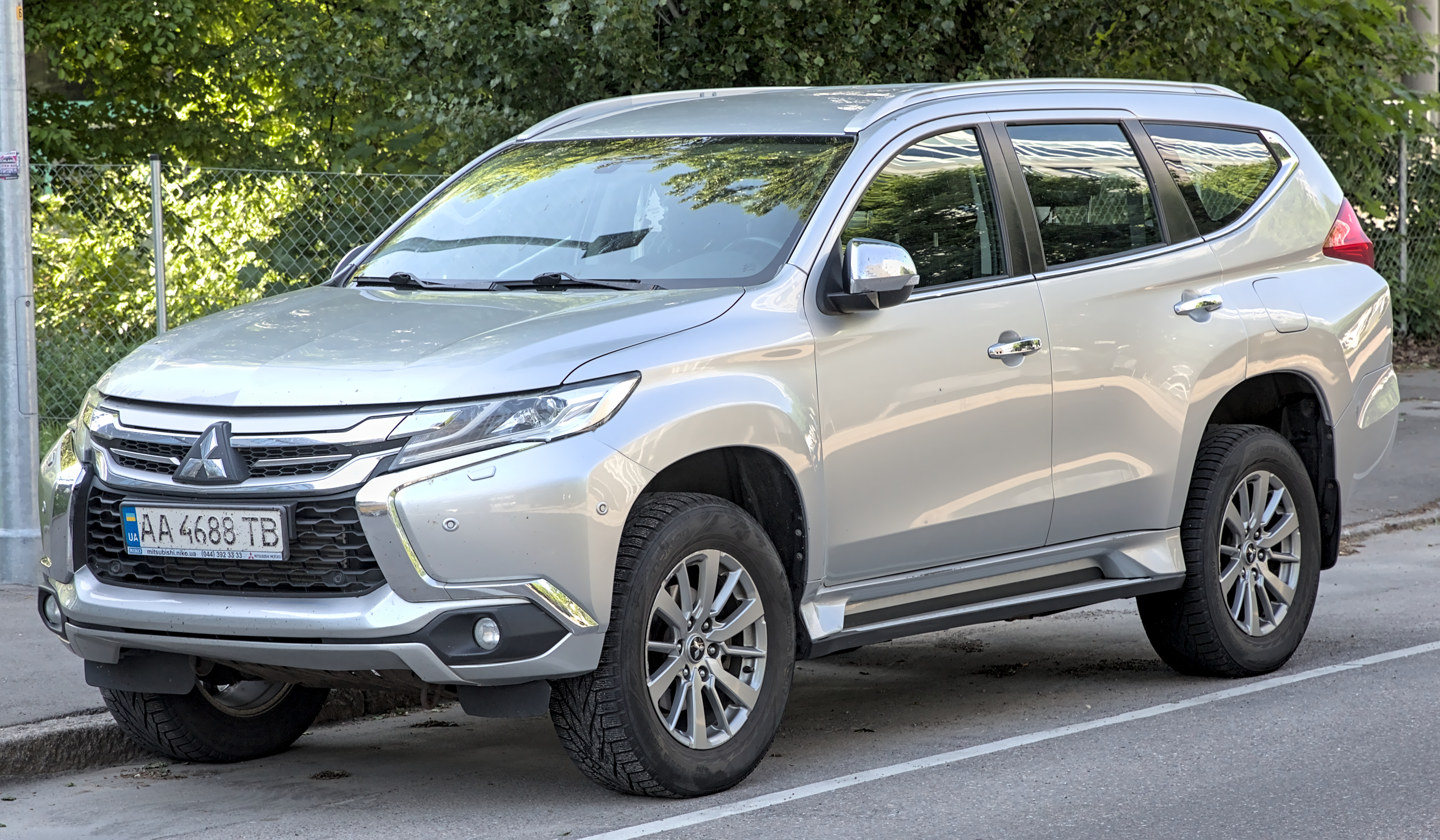

Overview
- Manufacturer: Mitsubishi Motors
- Also called: Mitsubishi Challenger (1996–2016); Mitsubishi Montero Sport; Mitsubishi Shogun Sport (United Kingdom, 2000–2021)
- Production: 1996–present

Body and chassis
- Class: Mid-size SUV
- Body style: 5-door SUV
- Layout: Front-engine, rear-wheel-drive; Front-engine, four-wheel-drive
- Chassis: Body-on-frame
- Related: Mitsubishi Triton

Chronology
- Successor: Mitsubishi Pajero (fifth generation) (Australia)

The Mitsubishi Pajero Sport is a body-on-frame mid-size SUV produced by the Japanese manufacturer Mitsubishi Motors using the Pajero nameplate since 1996. It has spanned over three generations, based on the Triton pickup truck.

Mitsubishi has formerly used the Mitsubishi Challenger (Japanese: 三菱・チャレンジャー, Hepburn: Mitsubishi Charenjā) name for the vehicle in Japan and some international markets, but the name was dropped since the third generation in 2015 in favour of the Pajero Sport, Montero Sport, and Shogun Sport nameplates.

== First generation (K80/K90/PA/PA II; 1996) ==
First generation
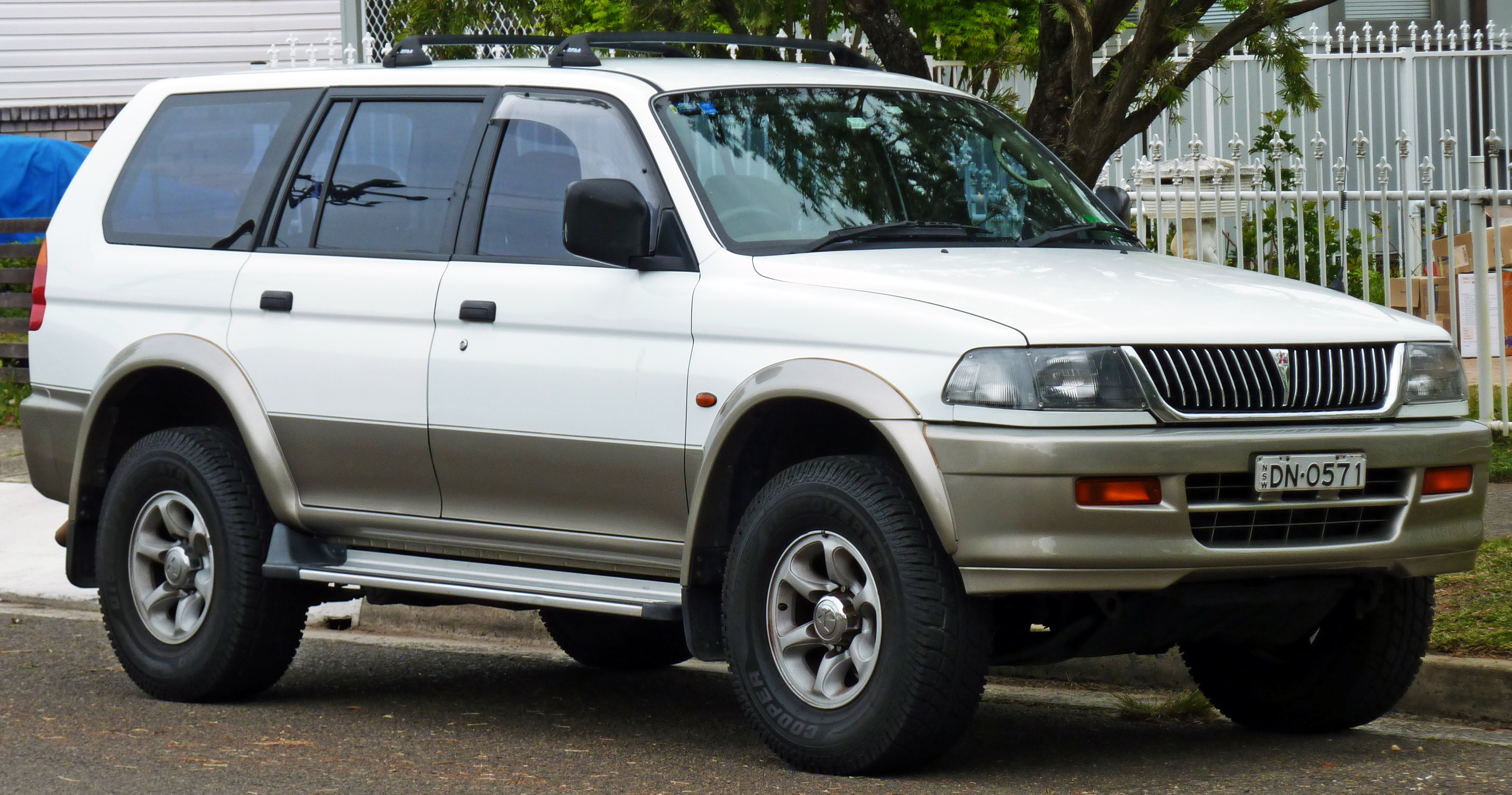

Overview
- Model code: K80 (2WD models); K90 (4WD models); PA (Australia, 1998–1999); PA II (Australia, 2000–2006)
- Also called: Mitsubishi Challenger (Japan and Australia); Mitsubishi Montero Sport; Mitsubishi Shogun Sport (United Kingdom); Mitsubishi Strada G-Wagon (Thailand); Mitsubishi Nativa; Beijing BJ2025 (China)
- Production: 1996–2008; 2006–2010 (Brazil)
- Assembly: Japan: Okazaki, Aichi (Nagoya Plant: 1996–2008); Thailand: Laem Chabang (MMTh: 2001–2005); China: Beijing (Beijing Jeep: 2003–2005; Beijing Benz: 2005–2008); Brazil: Catalão (Mitsubishi Motors Brasil: 2006–2010)

Body and chassis
- Related: Mitsubishi Triton (third generation)

Powertrain
- Engine: Petrol: 2.4 L 4G64 I4; 3.0 L 6G72 V6; 3.5 L 6G74 V6; Diesel: 2.5 L 4D56 turbo I4; 2.8 L 4M40 I4; 2.8 L 4M40 turbo I4; 3.2 L 4M41 turbo I4
- Transmission: 5-speed V5MT1 manual; 5-speed INVECS-II semi-automatic; 4-speed automatic

Dimensions
- Wheelbase: 2,725 mm (107.3 in)
- Length: 4,620 mm (181.9 in)
- Width: 1,775 mm (69.9 in)
- Height: 1,735 mm (68.3 in)
- Curb weight: 1,845–1,920 kg (4,068–4,233 lb)

Chronology
- Successor: Mitsubishi Endeavor (North America)

For the SUV sold alongside the first generation Montero Sport in Latin American markets, see Mitsubishi Montero Outlander.

Production began in Japan in 1996, and was available for most export markets by 1997, where it was variously known as the Challenger, Pajero Sport in Europe, Montero Sport in North America, South America, Spain and the Philippines, Nativa in parts of Latin America, the Caribbean and the Middle East, Shogun Sport in the United Kingdom, and Strada G-Wagon in Thailand. Based on the Strada pickup truck of the same vintage, sharing many components and some body panels (i.e. front doors), the first-generation Pajero Sport was also built on the second-generation Pajero wheelbase, and served as a smaller model to the larger Pajero.

Like the Pajero, it featured independent front suspension with torsion bars and a live rear axle. In addition to numerous facelifts over the years, there was a major suspension change from rear leaf to coil springs in late 2000. As its popularity increased, local assembly for foreign markets was introduced in China in 2003, and Brazil in 2006. Sales were discontinued in Japan in 2003. In the United States, where it was superseded by the Endeavor, sales ended in 2004. Sales in central and western Europe ended in 2008, with the introduction of the second generation Pajero/Montero Sport. In Japan, it was sold at a specific retail chain called Car Plaza.

The 3-litre V6 is the most commonly used engine; it produces 175 hp (130 kW; 177 PS) at 5,000 rpm. The North American market received petrol V6 engines during all years of production while a petrol 2.4-litre engine was offered on base models from 1997 through 1999 in the United States and for additional years in Canada. Markets outside of North America also had a variety of turbo-diesel four-cylinder engines to choose between.

=== Gallery ===
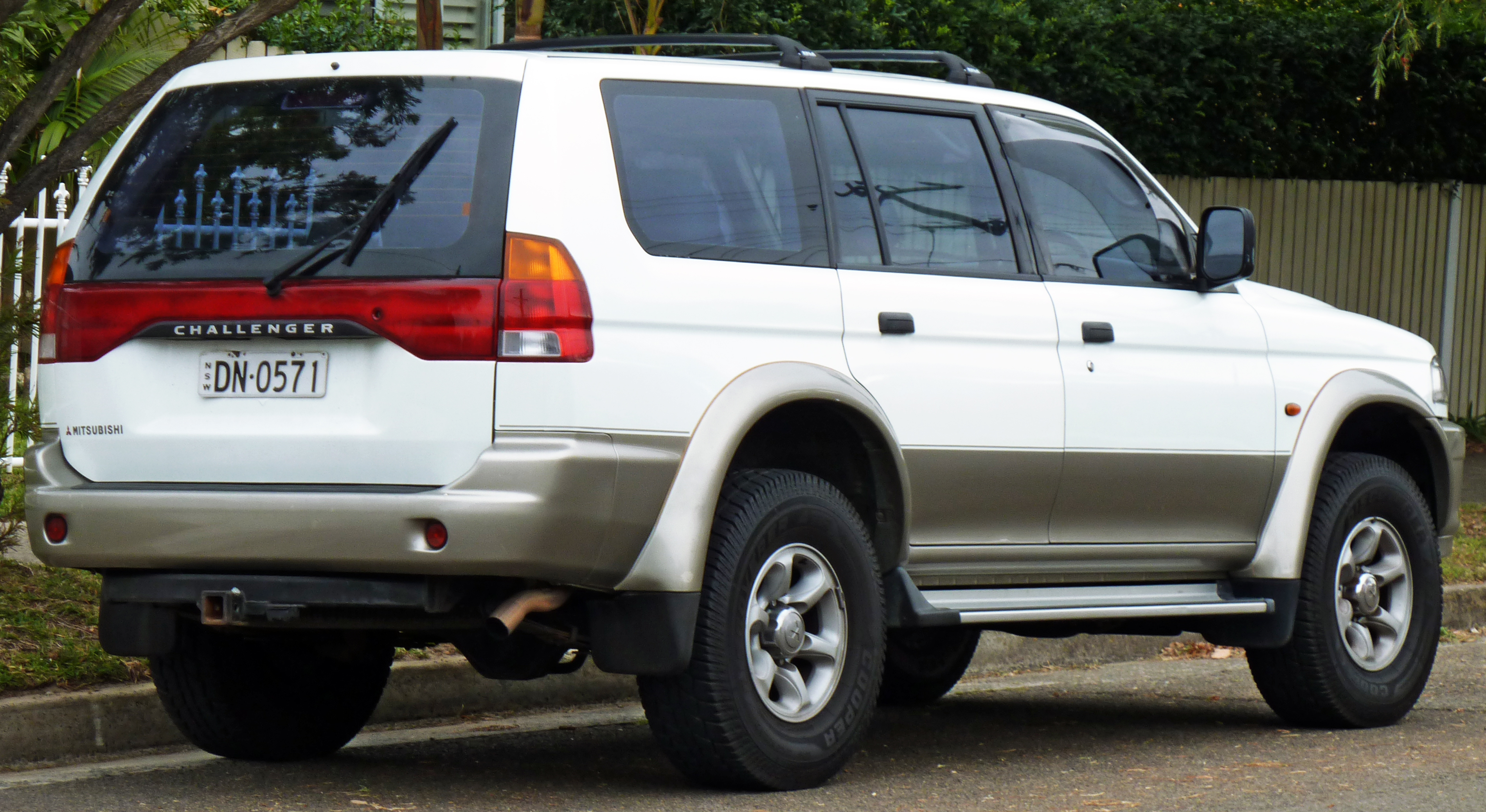
1998–2000 Mitsubishi Challenger

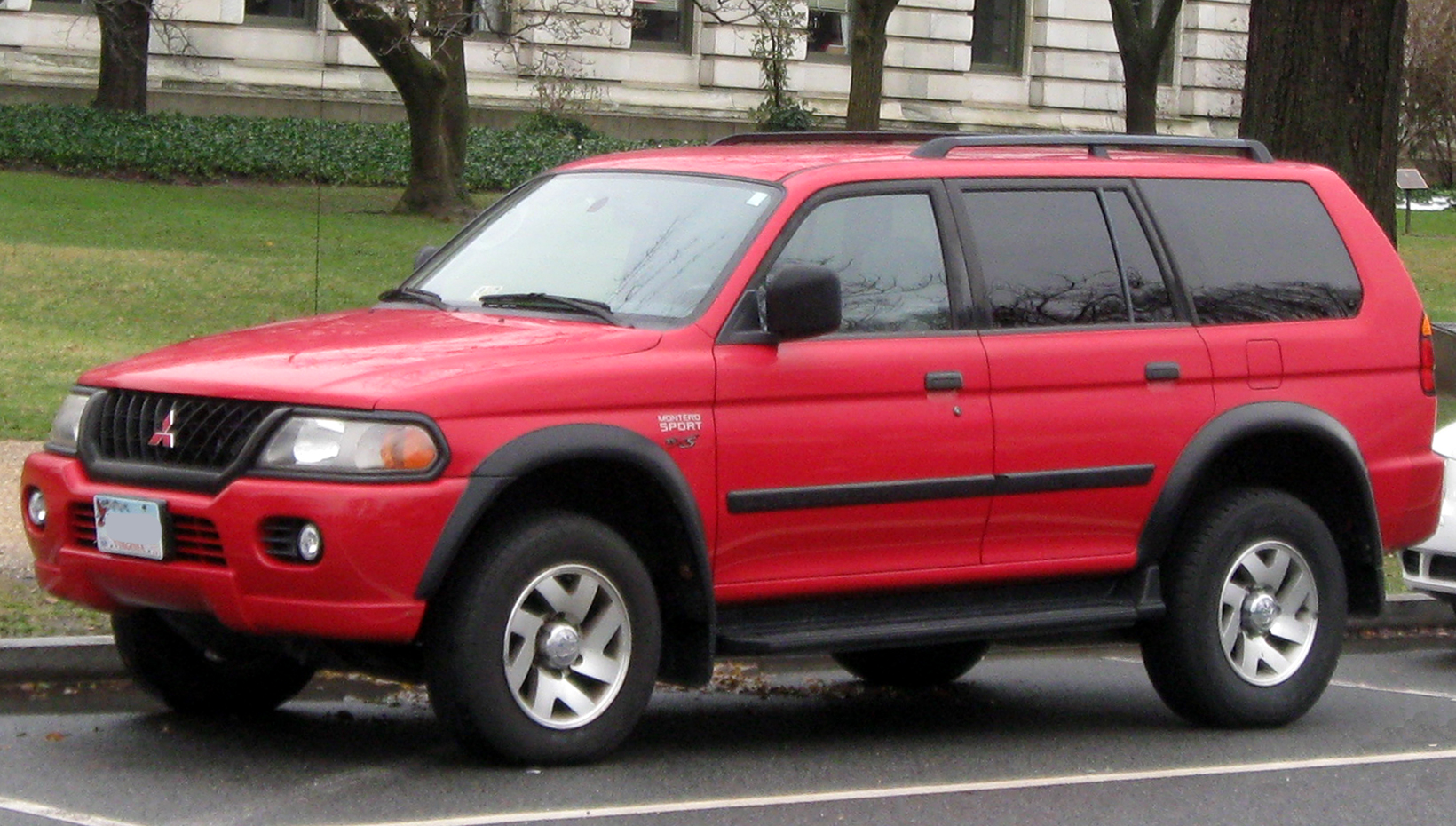
2000–2004 Mitsubishi Montero Sport (US)

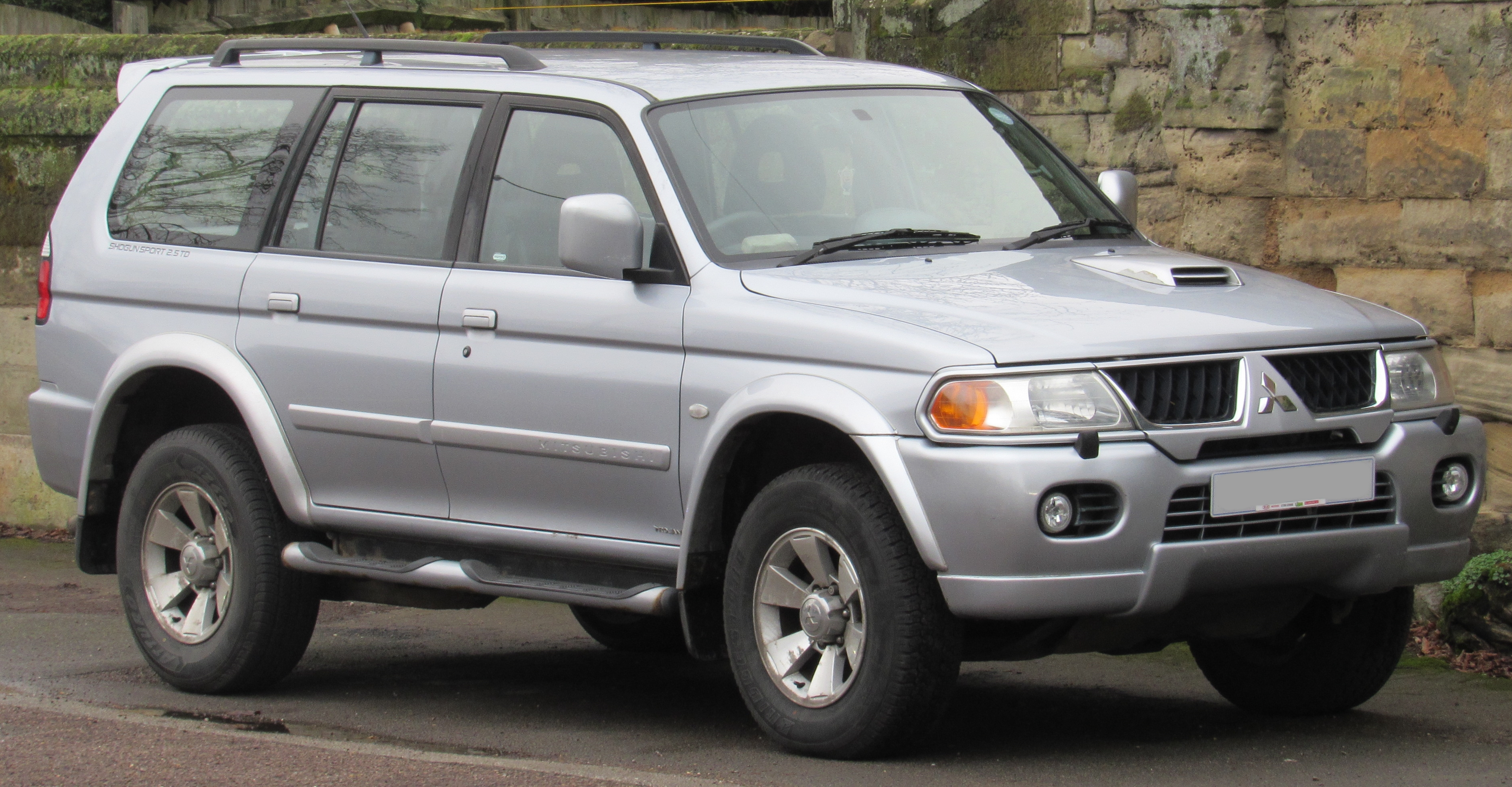
2004–2006 Mitsubishi Shogun Sport Trojan

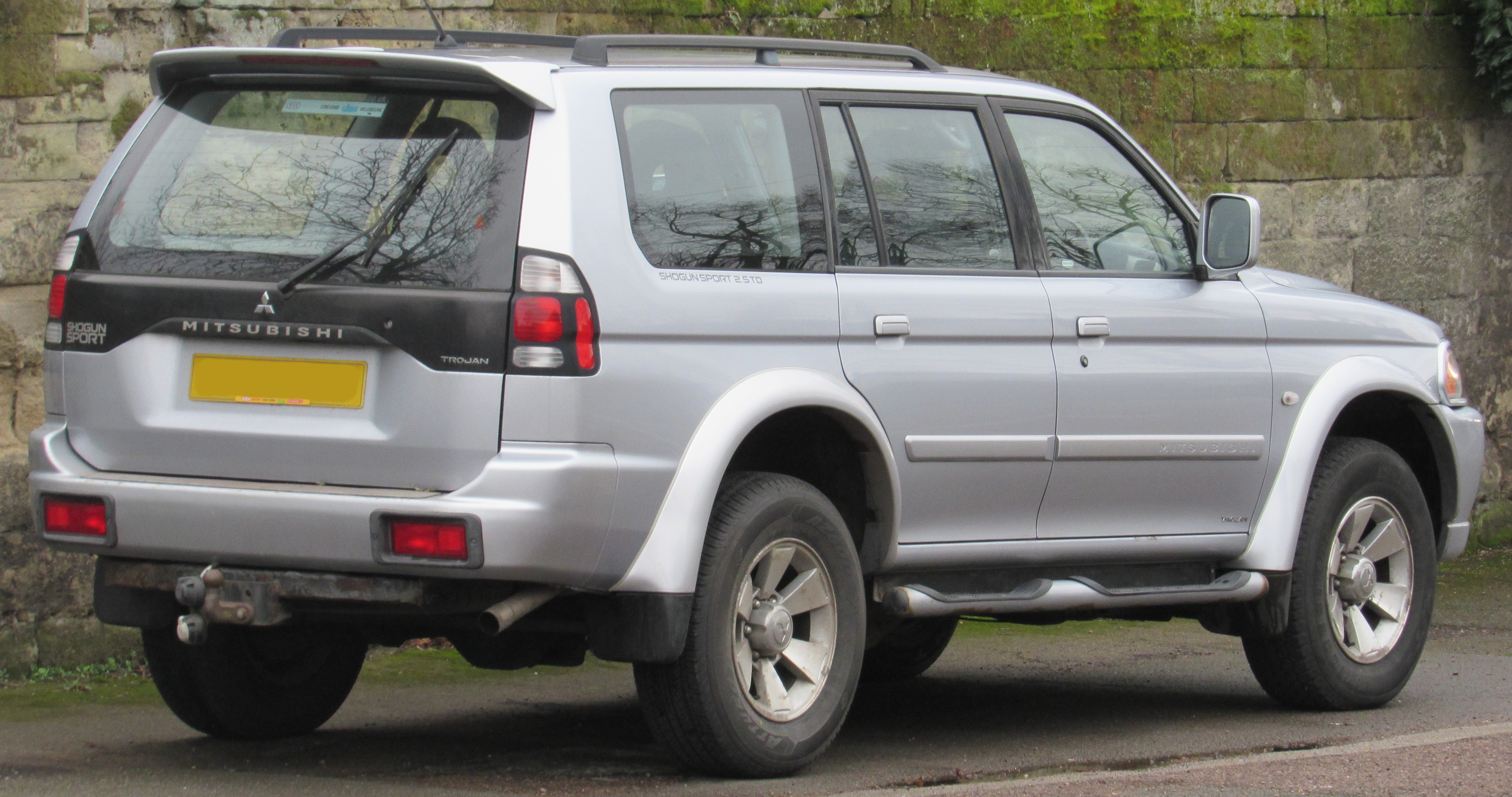
2004–2006 Mitsubishi Shogun Sport Trojan

== Second generation (KG/KH/PB; 2008) ==
Second generation
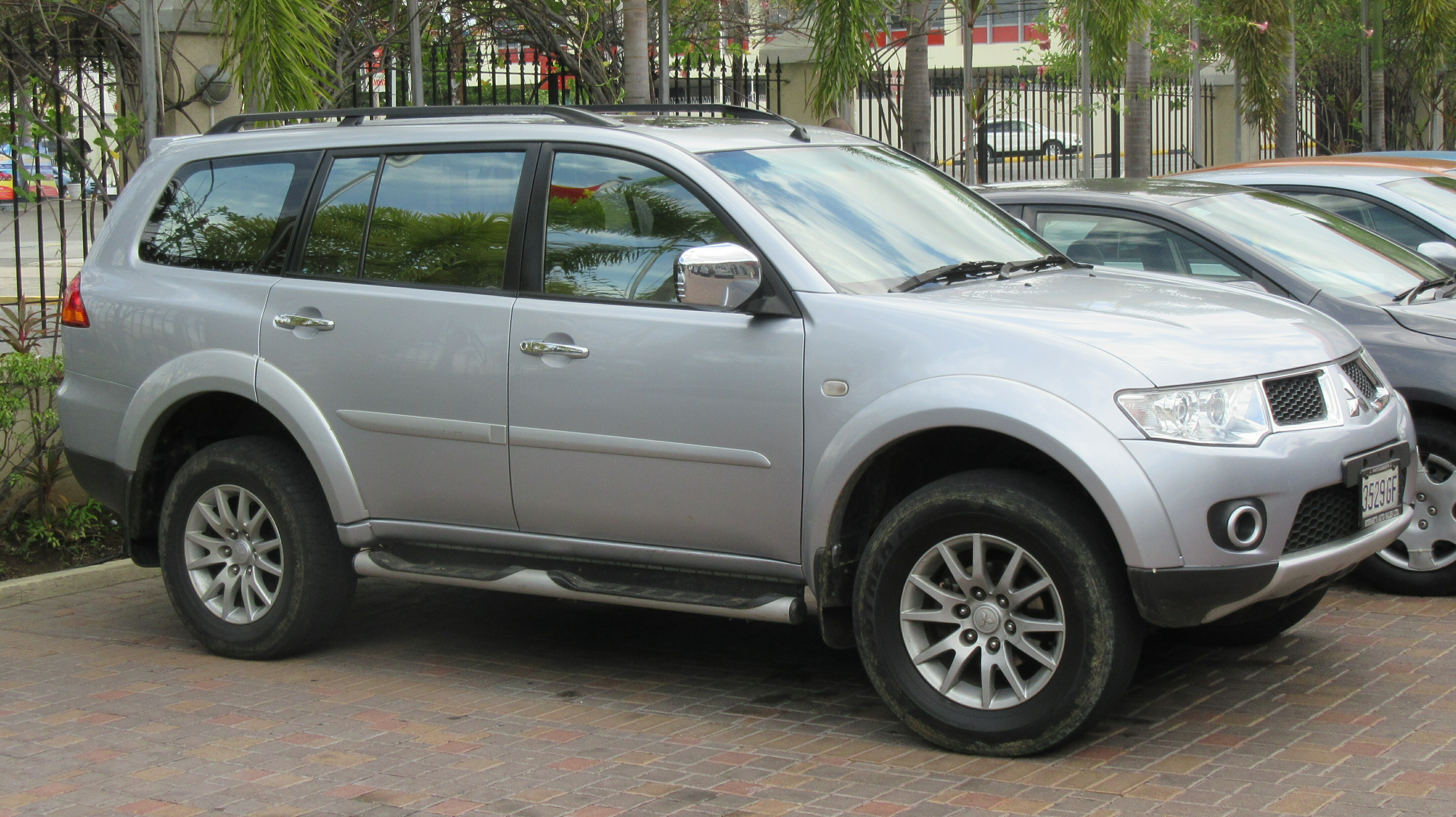
- Mitsubishi Pajero Sport (pre-facelift)

Overview
- Model code: KG (2WD models); KH (4WD models); PB (Australia)
- Also called: Mitsubishi Montero Sport; Mitsubishi Nativa; Mitsubishi Shogun Sport; Mitsubishi Challenger (Australia); Mitsubishi Pajero Dakar (Latin America)
- Production: 2008–2016
- Assembly: Thailand: Laem Chabang (MMTh); Brazil: Catalão (Mitsubishi Motors Brasil); Russia: Kaluga (PCMA Rus); China: Changsha, Hunan (GAC Mitsubishi); Venezuela: Barcelona (MMC Automotriz: 2013–2015); Bangladesh: Chittagong (Pragoti); India: Chennai (HM-Mitsubishi)

Body and chassis
- Related: Mitsubishi Triton (fourth generation)

Powertrain
- Engine: Petrol: 2.4 L 4G64 I4; 3.0 L 6B31 V6; 3.5 L 6G74 V6; Diesel: 2.5 L 4D56 turbo I4; 3.2 L 4M41 turbo I4
- Power output: 94 kW (126 hp; 128 PS) (4G64); 162 kW (217 hp; 220 PS) (6B31); 139 kW (186 hp; 189 PS) (6G74); 100–131 kW (134–176 hp; 136–178 PS) (4D56); 121 kW (162 hp; 165 PS) (4M41)
- Transmission: 5-speed V5MT1 manual; 5-speed INVECS-II with Sport Mode SMART semi-automatic; 4-speed INVECS-II with Sportronic Mode

Dimensions
- Wheelbase: 2,800 mm (110.2 in)
- Length: 4,695 mm (184.8 in)
- Width: 1,815 mm (71.5 in)
- Height: 1,840 mm (72.4 in)

The second-generation of the vehicle, based on the ladder frame chassis of the Triton, was gradually introduced to selected markets (Russia, Southeast Asia and the Middle East) through the autumn of 2008, following its debut at the Moscow International Automobile Salon. The design is partially influenced from the 2001 Pajero Evolution 2+2 concept car. 2.5- or 3.2-litre diesel and 2.4- 3.0- or 3.5-litre V6 petrol engines are available as before, while five- or seven-seat interior configurations are offered. As with the Triton pickup on which it is based, production of the new Pajero Sport for all markets is concentrated in Thailand.

The car has a leather interior, with a screen at the front dashboard that includes a clock, compass, fuel economy monitor, and more features. The 2nd row has individual air conditioning vents, and a control panel to control the air conditioning for the rear seats. The 3rd row comes with 2 cup holders and a power outlet.

=== Markets ===
==== Southeast Asia ====
===== Philippines =====
In the Philippines, the Pajero Sport is officially named as Montero Sport. The Montero Sport was launched in the Philippines on October of 2008 and it was offered with only one engine, a 3.2 litre “4M41” Common Rail Direct Injection Diesel, putting out 163 PS and 343Nm of torque. Mated to the engine is an INVECS-II four-speed automatic transmission (with Sportronic mode) and two variants were offered: GLS and the top of the-line GLS SE. In 2011, The Montero Sport lineup received a powerboost equipped with a 2.5 litre “4D56”, it now produces a staggering 178 ps of power and 350Nm of torque (15 ps and 7Nm more than the previous 3.2 litre turbo diesel Montero Sport). In courtesy of a Variable Geometry Turbo equipped with a 2.5 litre common rail diesel engine with a variable geometry turbo (VGT), boasted of a 15% improvement in power over the previous 3.2 litre's 163 hp. Not only was it more powerful and responsive, the smaller engine also made for better fuel economy. Now called Montero Sport GLS-V, this midrange variant receives an additional accessory outlet, reverse sensors, tailgate cladding, 2DIN monitor Audio unit with bluetooth and GPS, and larger disc brakes aside from the stronger engine. In the same year, replacing the previous top-of-the-line GLS SE, The Montero Sport GTV now comes with new grille, DVD audio, emblems, carbon fibre rear spoiler, paddle shifters and new 5-speed automatic transmission.

===== Indonesia =====
In Indonesia, the Pajero Sport was first launched on 18 June 2009. Initially, the Pajero Sport was available in two trim levels: GLX, and Exceed, which was then followed by the entry-level GLS which was released a year later. The Dakar variants was added in April 2011. The Limited trim was added on 24 May 2013, features additional accessories, available for all grades except GLS. The facelift model was released on 8 October 2013.

===== Malaysia =====
In Malaysia, the Pajero Sport was first introduced in June 2009. The Pajero Sport VGT was launched on 22 September 2011.

==== South Asia ====
===== India =====
In India, the Pajero Sport was imported in CKD kits, and assembled by Hindustan Motors-Mitsubishi joint venture. It is equipped with a 4D56-T 2.5-litre turbo-diesel. It was discontinued in 2019.

===== Bangladesh =====
In Bangladesh, the Pajero Sport is assembled by state-owned automotive industry Pragoti.

=== Gallery ===
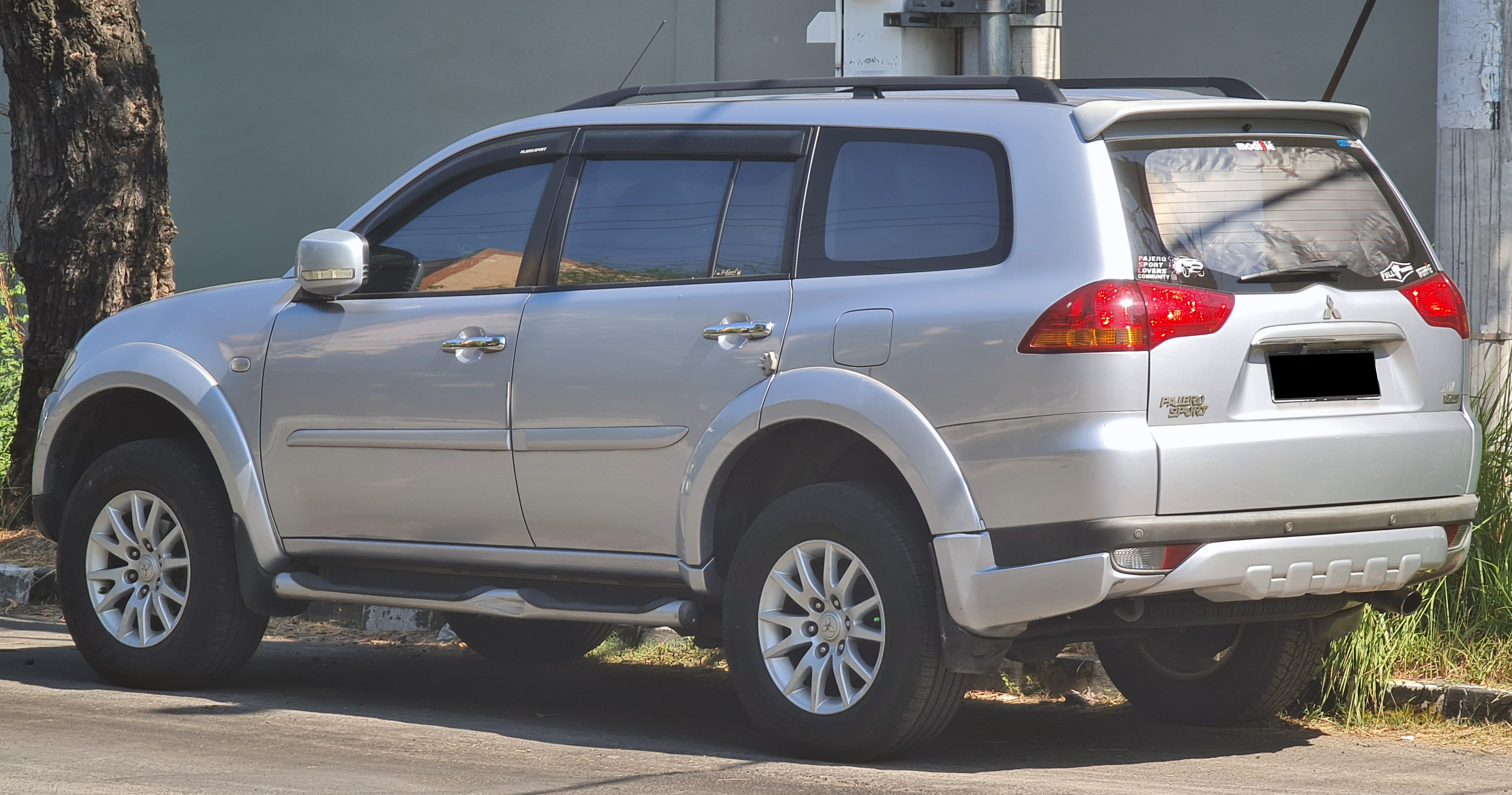
Mitsubishi Pajero Sport Exceed (Indonesia; pre-facelift)

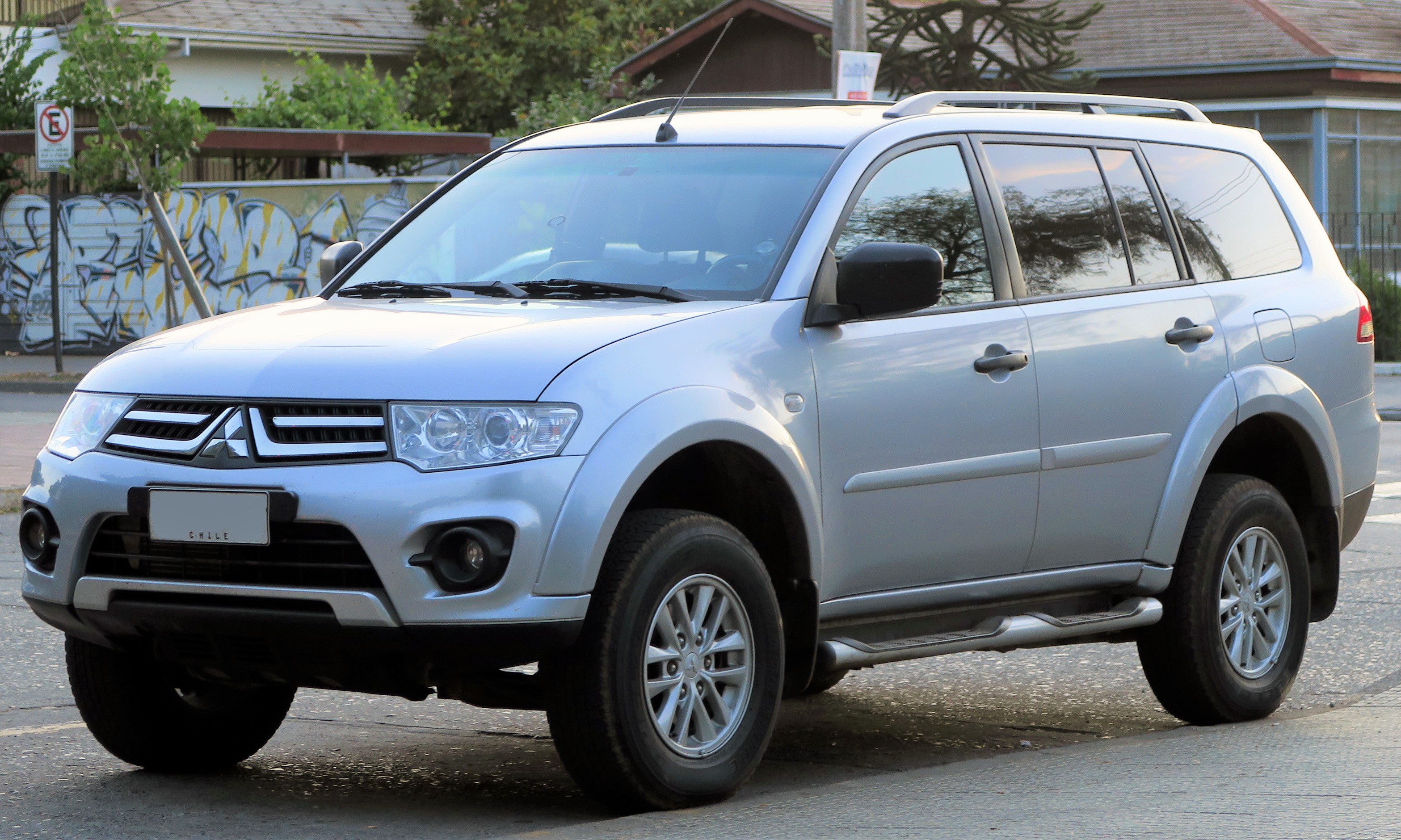
Mitsubishi Montero Sport G2 (Chile; facelift)

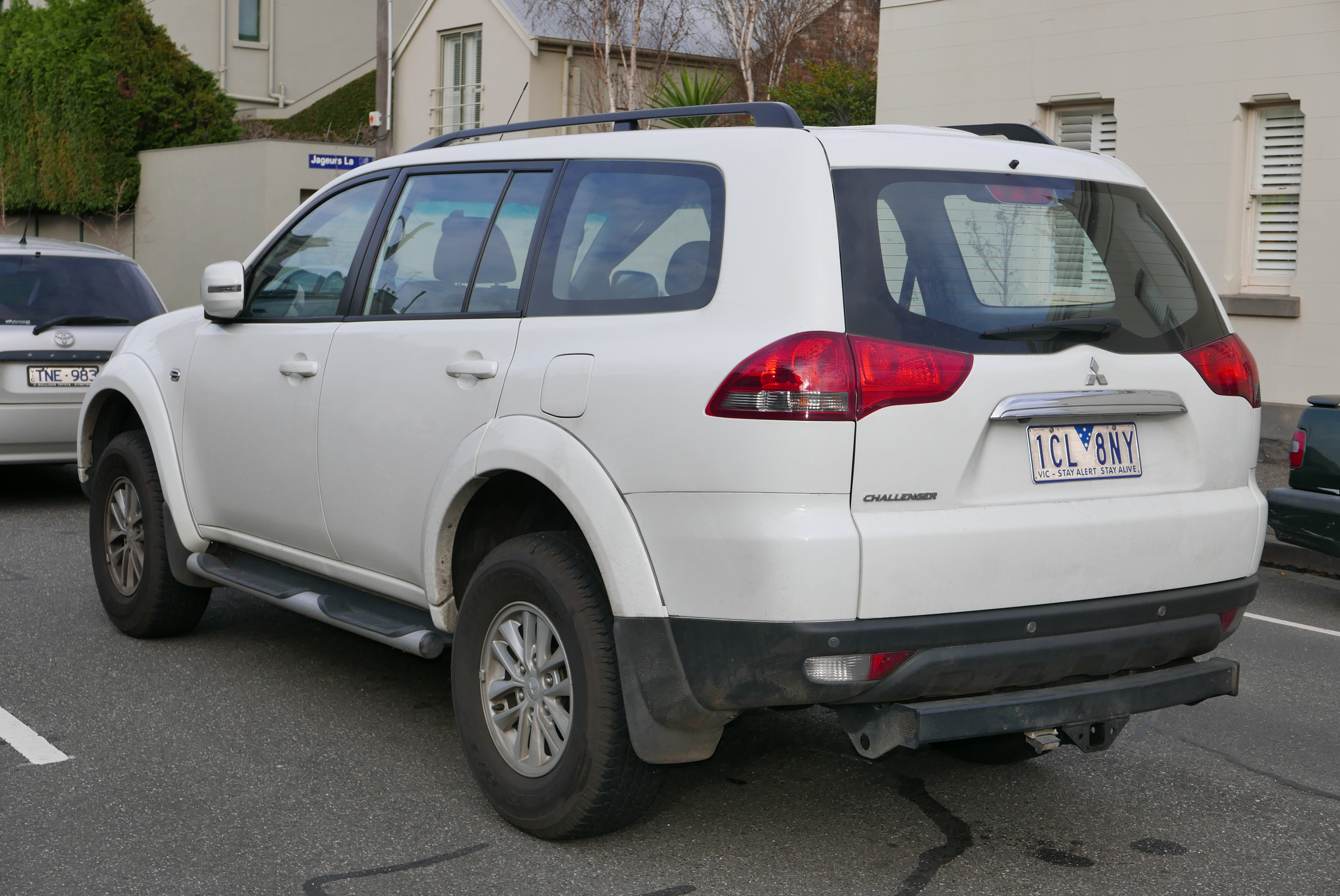
Mitsubishi Challenger (Australia; facelift)

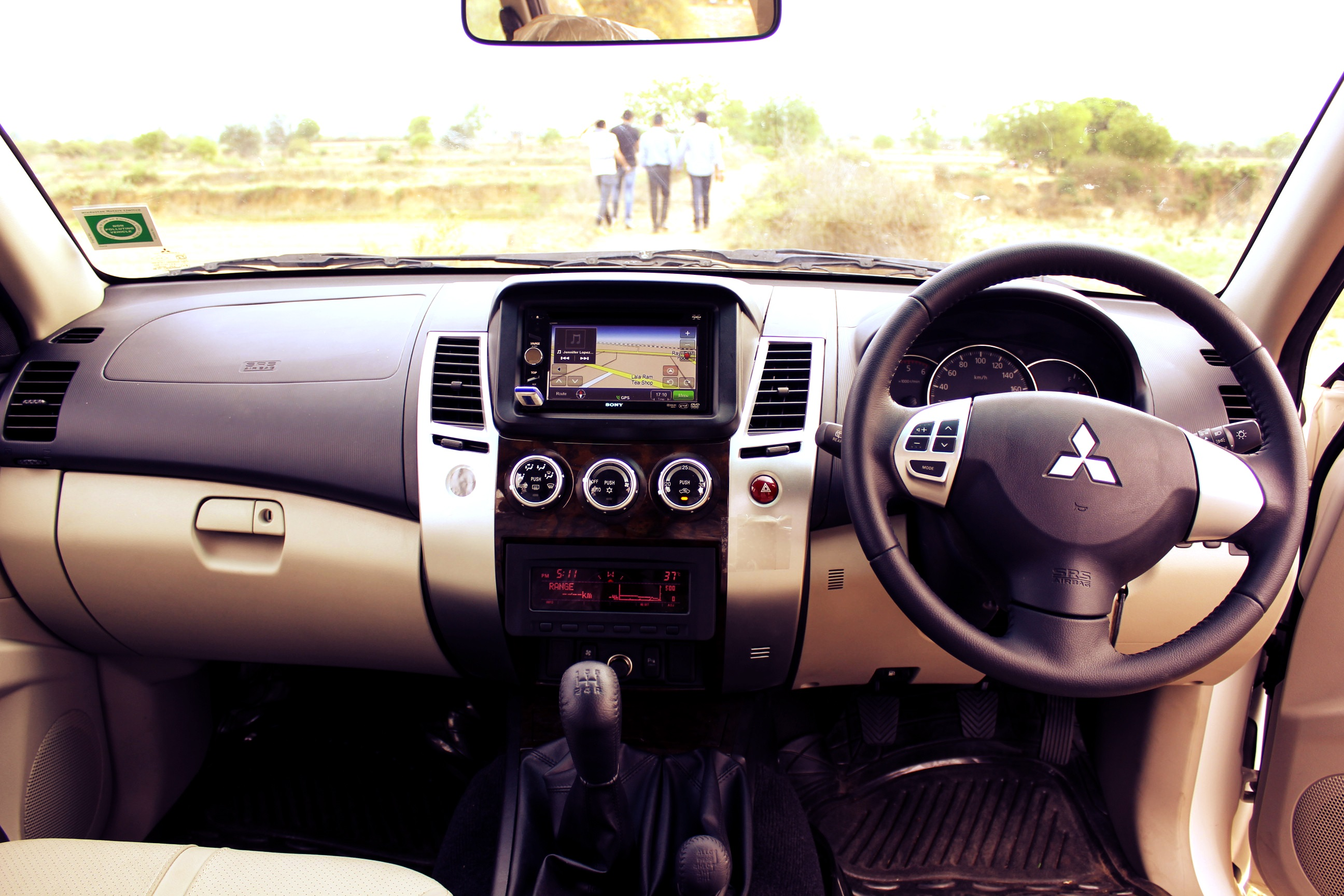
Interior

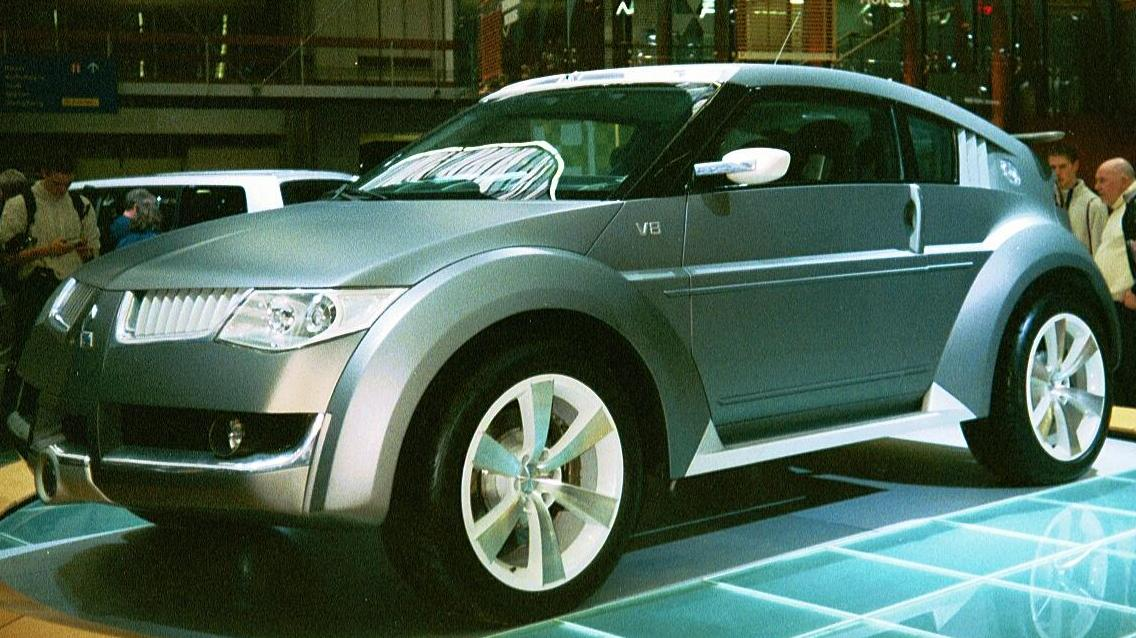
Pajero Evolution 2+2 concept, which previewed the second generation Pajero Sport

=== Sudden unintended acceleration issue ===
In 2011, Montero Sport owners in the Philippines reported that their vehicles suffered from sudden unintended acceleration. Mitsubishi Motors Philippines later responded with a statement saying that they conducted tests on the Montero Sport's electrical systems and found no problems; furthermore, they stated that the accidents related to the issue were more likely caused by human error. Owners of Montero Sport affected by the sudden unintended acceleration issue plan to file a class action lawsuit against Mitsubishi Motors Philippines. The Department of Trade and Industry (DTI) opened an investigation panel to probe the accidents and complaints from 2010 to 2015, and will recommend either a product recall or a total sales ban on the Montero Sport in the country.

=== Safety ===
ANCAP test results* Mitsubishi Challenger (2010)
Test	Score
Overall	4 /5 stars
Frontal offset	9.08/16
Side impact	16/16
Pole	Not Assessed
Seat belt reminders	0/3
Whiplash protection	Not Assessed
Pedestrian protection	Poor
Electronic stability control	Standard

ASEAN NCAP test results Mitsubishi Pajero Sport (2013)
Test	Points	Stars
Adult occupant:	12.08	4 /5 stars
Child occupant:	40%	0 /5 stars
Safety assist:	NA	

== Third generation (KR/KS/QE/QF; 2015) ==
Third generation
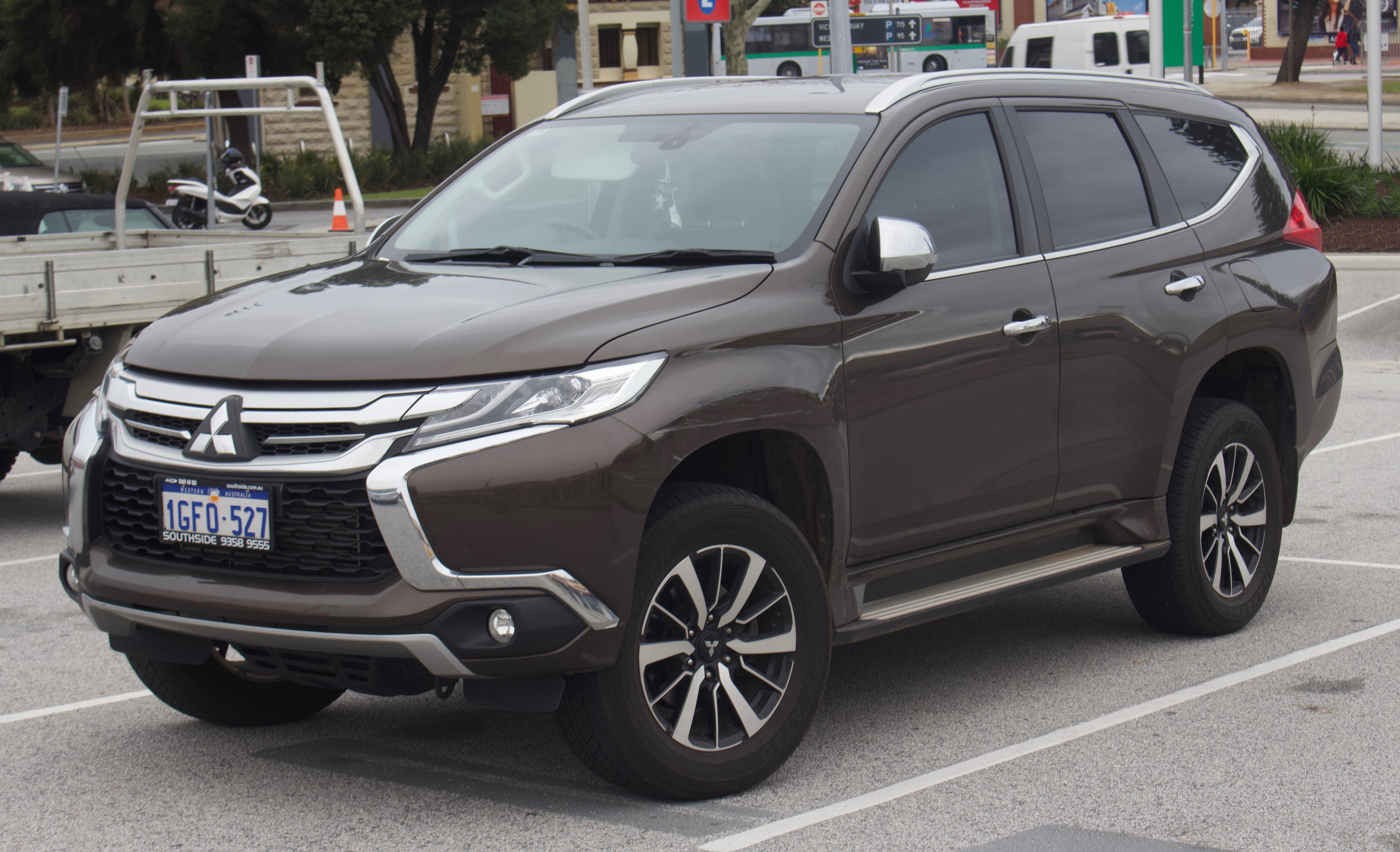
- 2017 Mitsubishi Pajero Sport GLS (Australia; pre-facelift)

Overview
- Model code: KR (2WD models); KS (4WD models); QE (Australia, 2016–2019); QF (Australia, facelift)
- Also called: Mitsubishi Montero Sport; Mitsubishi Shogun Sport (United Kingdom, until 2020)
- Production: 2015–present
- Assembly: Thailand: Laem Chabang (MMTh); Indonesia: Cikarang, West Java (MMKI; from 2017); Russia: Kaluga (PCMA Rus); Bangladesh: Chittagong (Pragoti)
- Designer: Atsunori Mitsuda, Naoki Akita, Osamu Tsuchiya, Toshihiro Imaeda and Yutaka Iwata (pre-facelift); Tsunehiro Kunimoto (facelift)

Body and chassis
- Related: Mitsubishi Triton (fifth generation)

Powertrain
- Engine: Petrol: 3.0 L 6B31 V6; Diesel: 2.4 L 4N15 MIVEC turbo I4; 2.4 L 4N16 MIVEC turbo I4 (2024–present); 2.5 L 4D56 turbo I4
- Power output: 162 kW (217 hp; 220 PS) (6B31); 133 kW (178 hp; 181 PS) (4N15); 135 kW (181 hp; 184 PS) (4N16); 100 kW (134 hp; 136 PS) (4D56)
- Transmission: 5-speed manual; 6-speed manual; 5-speed automatic; 6-speed Aisin automatic (Thailand; since 2024); 8-speed Aisin TL-80SN/TL-80NF automatic

Dimensions
- Wheelbase: 2,800 mm (110.2 in)
- Length: 4,785–4,825 mm (188.4–190.0 in)
- Width: 1,815 mm (71.5 in)
- Height: 1,805 mm (71.1 in)
- Curb weight: 2,045 kg (4,508 lb)

Chronology
- Successor: Mitsubishi Pajero (fifth generation) (Australia)

On 1 August 2015, Mitsubishi Motors unveiled the third-generation Pajero Sport in Thailand. It is the first Mitsubishi sold in Thailand to use the Dynamic Shield exterior design, the interior is designed with a T-Shape High Console with a dashboard layout similar to the Triton, equipped with a range active safety features, it uses the new 4N15 2.4L MIVEC diesel engine, and is available with Mitsubishi's Super-Select 4WD-II four-wheel drive system that features a new off-road mode and hill descent control system (a first on a Mitsubishi model).

Since September 2026, the Pajero Sport has been replaced as Mitsubishi's flagship by the Pajero after its return, and will be sold together in some markets.

During a press release that followed, Mitsubishi also heavily implied that there will no longer be any future generations of the Pajero Sport.

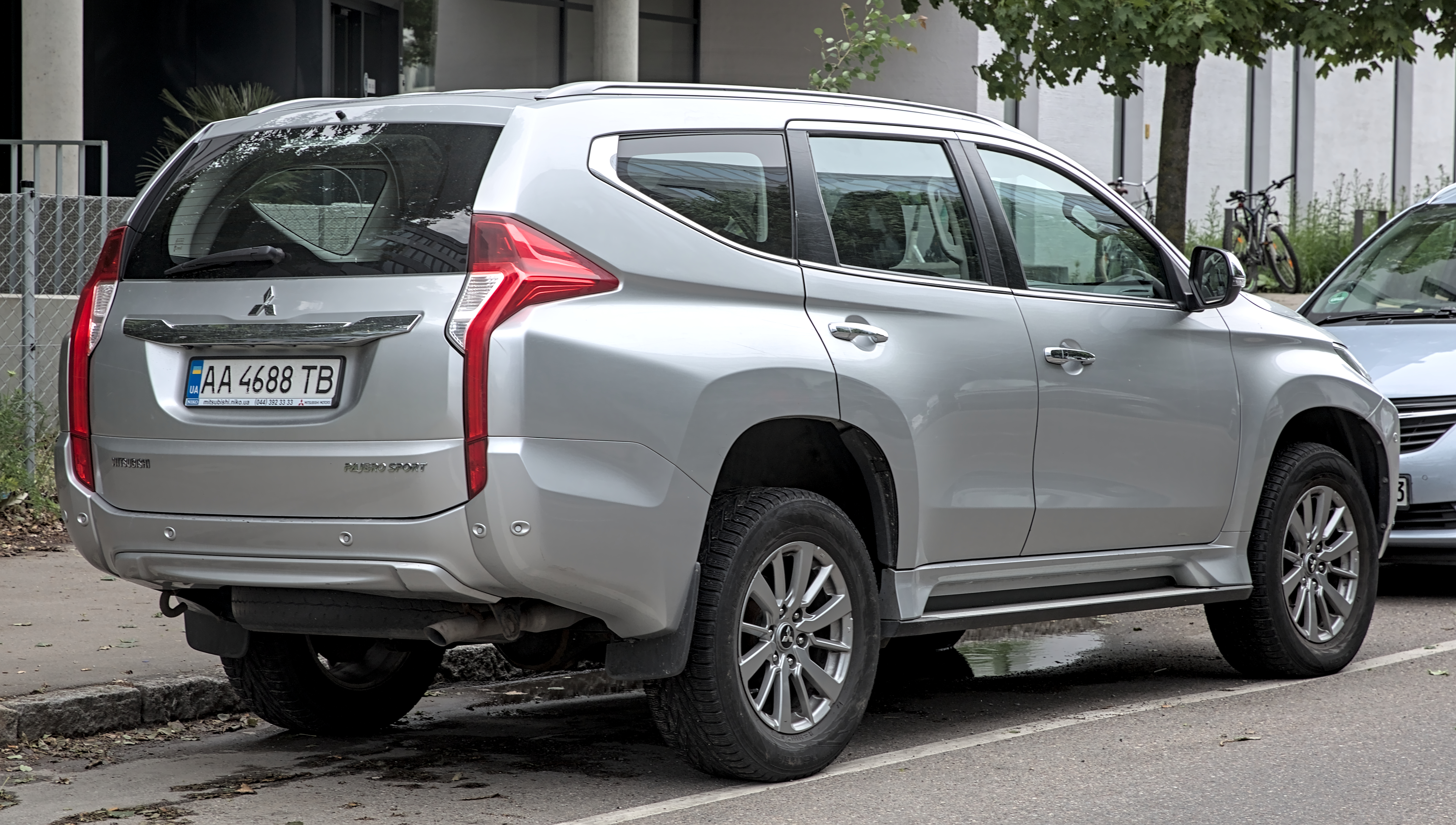
Rear view (pre-facelift)

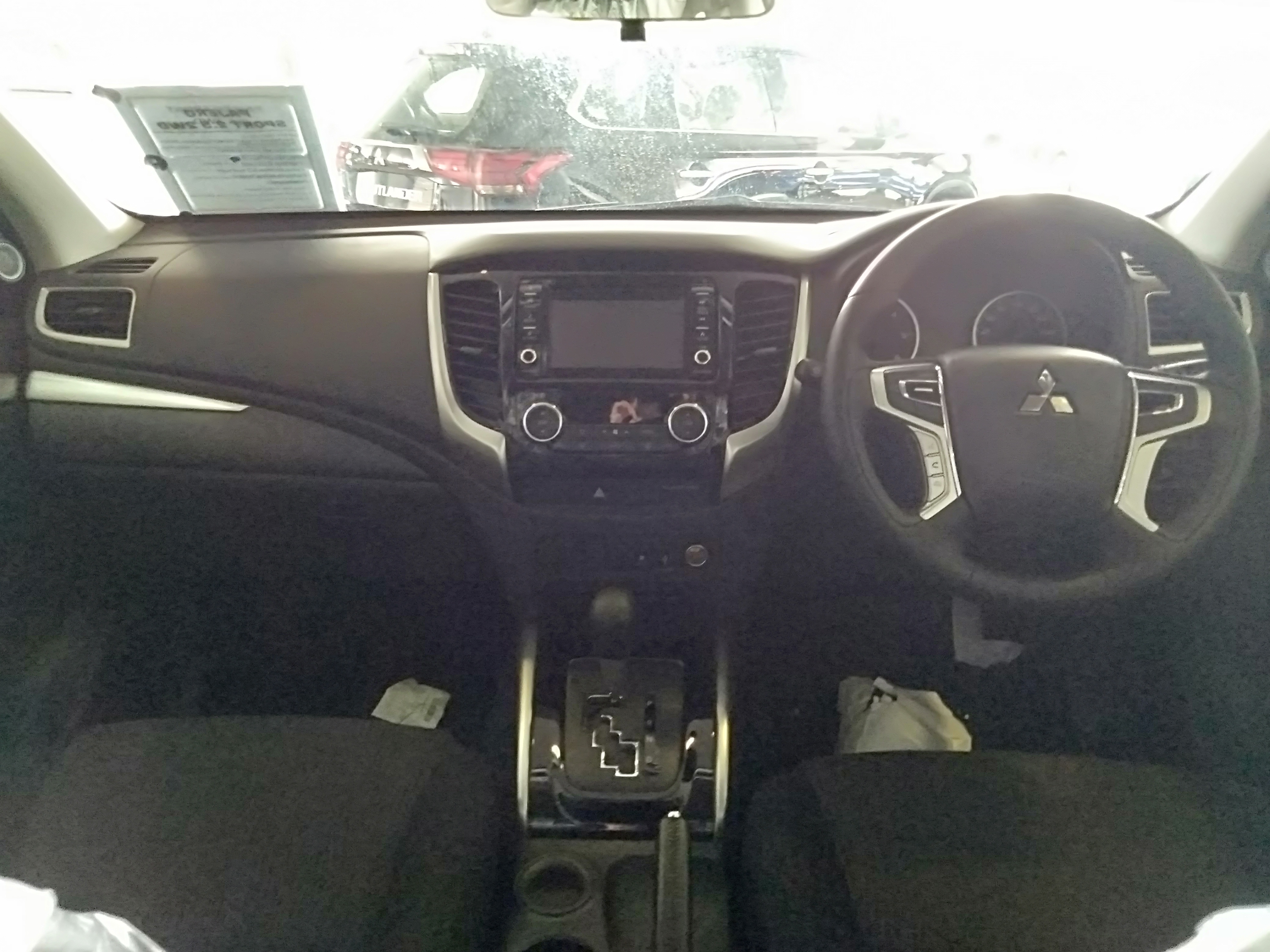
Interior (pre-facelift)

=== Powertrain ===
The Pajero Sport/Montero Sport has three engine options. The 4D56 DI-D common rail produces 136 PS (100 kW; 134 hp) and 324 N⋅m (239 lb⋅ft; 33 kg⋅m) (GLX and Exceed trims in Indonesia) mated to a 5-speed manual transmission (GLX/Exceed) or 5-speed automatic transmission (Exceed) and 4N15 MIVEC with Variable Geometry Turbo producing 181 PS (133 kW; 179 hp) and 430 N⋅m (317 lb⋅ft; 44 kg⋅m) (Dakar trim in Indonesia and all variants in the Philippines and Thailand) mated to a 6-speed manual transmission or an 8-speed automatic transmission and the 3.0L 6B31 MIVEC V6 petrol engine mated with an 8-speed automatic transmission. The petrol V6 engine was not available in Indonesia.

=== Markets ===
==== Asia ====
===== Bangladesh =====
In Bangladesh, it is marketed as the Pajero Sport and assembled by Pragoti in Chittagong. It also manufactured the car.

===== Indonesia =====
The third-generation Pajero Sport was launched in Indonesia on 29 January 2016, in three trim levels: GLX, Exceed and Dakar; it is powered by a 2.4-litre 4N15 MIVEC VGT diesel engine. From launch, it was initially a CBU model imported from Thailand. Since April 2017, it is locally assembled at the PT Mitsubishi Motors Krama Yudha Indonesia (MMKI) plant in Bekasi, West Java, starting for the Dakar variants and the lower variants followed at a later date.

The Rockford Fosgate Edition variant based on the Dakar trim was made available in April 2018. Only 1,000 units were produced, which added the Rockford Fosgate subwoofer.

In July 2019, the Rockford Fosgate Black Edition variant was released, features black forged rims, grille, roof rail, and Rockford Fosgate subwoofer, with limited run of 1,000 units. On 24 August 2020, the Rockford Fosgate Black Edition variant was reintroduced, with the same specifications as 2019.

The first facelifted model debuted on 16 February 2021 with the same variants as the pre-facelift model.

The Elite Limited Edition variant based on the Premium Package trim was launched in Indonesia on 9 May 2024. Based on Dakar 2WD, the variant also comes two-tone white colour with black accent such as on the grille, roof, black forged rims, front and under garnish, roof spoiler and mirrors. Only 800 units of the variant were produced, all units were finished in white.

The second facelifted model debuted on 17 July 2024 at the 31st Gaikindo Indonesia International Auto Show. The remaining variants remain unchanged.

===== Philippines =====
In the Philippines, the Pajero Sport is marketed as the Montero Sport and it was launched on 20 January 2016. It was initially available in four variants: GLS 4x2 (8-speed automatic), GLS Premium 4x2 (8-speed automatic), GLS 4x4 (6-speed manual), and GT 4x4 (8-speed automatic). All trim levels are powered by the 2.4-litre 4N15 MIVEC VGT diesel engine. The entry-level GLX 4x2 (6-speed manual) trim was added in December 2016.

The first facelift Montero Sport was launched on 4 October 2019, in GLX, GLS and GT grades. The Black Series grade was added in January 2022. The second facelift model was released in June 2024. The GT grade was replaced by the Black Series in both 4x2 and 4x4 drivetrains, all grades received a redesigned front end and lower bumper, and redesigned turbine-style 18" alloy wheels with gloss black finish for the Black Series models. The trim level choices for the second facelift model are the base GLX (manual only), mid-spec GLS and Black Series (both automatic only).

===== Thailand =====
At launch, the third-generation Pajero Sport was available in three trim levels: GLS Limited 4x2, GT 4x2 and GT Premium 4x4. It is powered by a 2.4-litre 4N15 MIVEC VGT diesel engine, with an 8-speed automatic transmission.

The first facelift model was available in GT 4x2, GT Premium 4x2 and GT Premium 4x4 trim levels. The second facelift model is available in Prime 4x2, Ultra 4x2, Elite 4x2 and Elite 4x4 trim levels, a 2.4-litre 4N15 MIVEC VGT diesel engine with an 8-speed automatic transmission was replaced by a 2.4-litre 4N16 MIVEC VGT diesel engine with a 6-speed automatic transmission. In February 2025, the Ultra trim was discontinued and the Prime received new features. In November 2025, the GT 4x2 variant was added to the line-up as the entry-level model.

===== Vietnam =====
The third-generation Pajero Sport was launched in Vietnam on 6 December 2016, in two variants, powered by a 3.0-litre 6B31 V6 petrol engine. The 2.4-litre 4N15 MIVEC VGT diesel was added in August 2018, along with manual option in January 2019.

The facelift model debuted on 6 October 2020 with two variants, both powered by a 2.4-litre 4N15 MIVEC VGT diesel engine.

==== Australia ====
The third-generation Pajero Sport went on sale in Australia on 7 December 2015, in three trim levels: GLX, GLS and Exceed, it is powered by a 2.4-litre 4N15 MIVEC VGT diesel engine.

The first facelift model debuted on 9 January 2020 with the same trim levels as the pre-facelift model. A flagship GSR trim was added in January 2022 and the addition of two-wheel drive variants. The second facelift model debuted on 1 May 2024, with all variants became available only with 4WD.

In the first quarter of 2024, the Pajero Sport was temporarily imported from Indonesia for the GLX 4x4 variant. In 2025, Mitsubishi ended production of the Pajero Sport for the Australian market, as the model did not meet new safety rules mandated on 1 March 2025 in Australia.

==== Europe ====
The Shogun Sport went on sale in the UK in April 2018, in '3' and '4' trim levels, powered by a 2.4-litre 4N15 MIVEC VGT diesel engine. A Commercial model based on the '4' trim was available features a 6-inch bulkhead, blackened rear windows and deleted second and third-row seats. It was discontinued in 2021 when Mitsubishi Motors withdraw from selling new car models in the UK.

==== GCC ====
In the Middle East, it is available with a 6B31 3.0-litre V6 petrol version.

==== Mexico ====
In Mexico, the Pajero Sport is marketed as the Montero Sport and it was launched on 21 November 2017. It is available in two trim levels: GLX and Advance; powered by a 3.0-litre 6B31 V6 petrol engine.

The facelift model debuted on 11 December 2020, with three trim levels: ES, SE and SE Plus, powered by the same engine from the pre-facelift model.

==== South Africa ====
The third-generation Pajero Sport was launched in South Africa on 31 August 2017, in two variants, both powered by a 2.4-litre 4N15 MIVEC VGT diesel engine.

The first facelift model debuted on 17 September 2020 with a new Exceed variant. The mid-range Aspire variant was added in March 2022. A flagship Shogun trim was available in limited sales numbers in August 2024.

The second facelift model debuted on 14 May 2025 with three variants: 2WD, 4WD and 4WD Exceed.

=== Facelift ===
The first facelifted third-generation Pajero Sport was launched in Thailand on 25 July 2019. The updated Pajero Sport gets a new dynamic shield front fascia with dual-layer headlight configuration. Tail lights were made shorter, following customer feedback. Engine and transmission remained the same as the outgoing model. Other notable improvements including Auto Hold parking brake, a new 8-inch digital instrument cluster and an 8-inch infotainment system with navigation, 360-degree surround cameras and support for Apple CarPlay and Android Auto, and hands-free powered tailgate. It was released to overseas markets from October 2019.

On 21 March 2024, a second facelift was revealed in Thailand with an updated design for the front grille and alloy wheels, and the interior receives a 3-spoke steering wheel. It was also revealed in Indonesia on 18 July 2024 during the 2024 Gaikindo Indonesia International Auto Show.

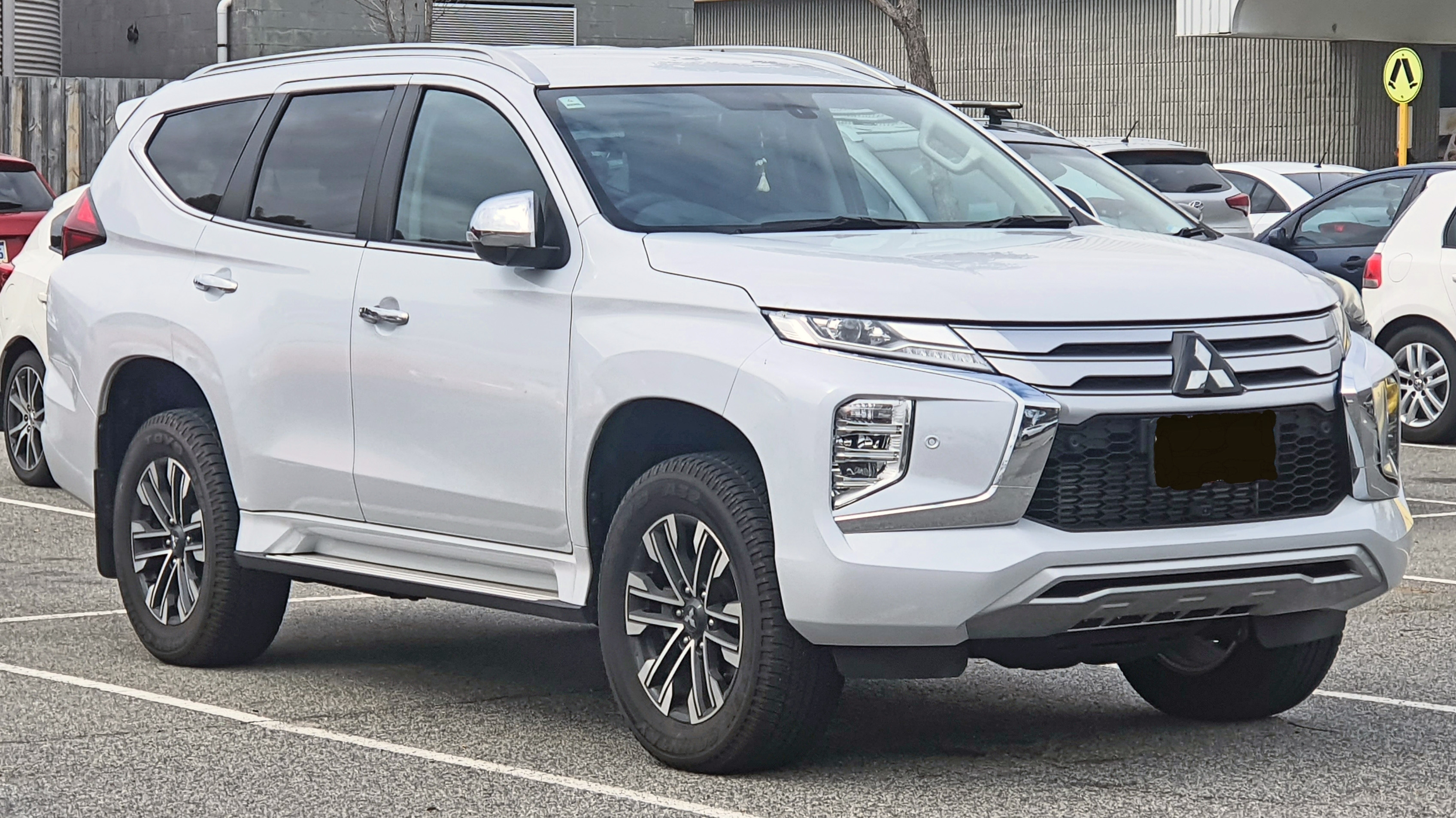
2021 Pajero Sport (first facelift, Australia)

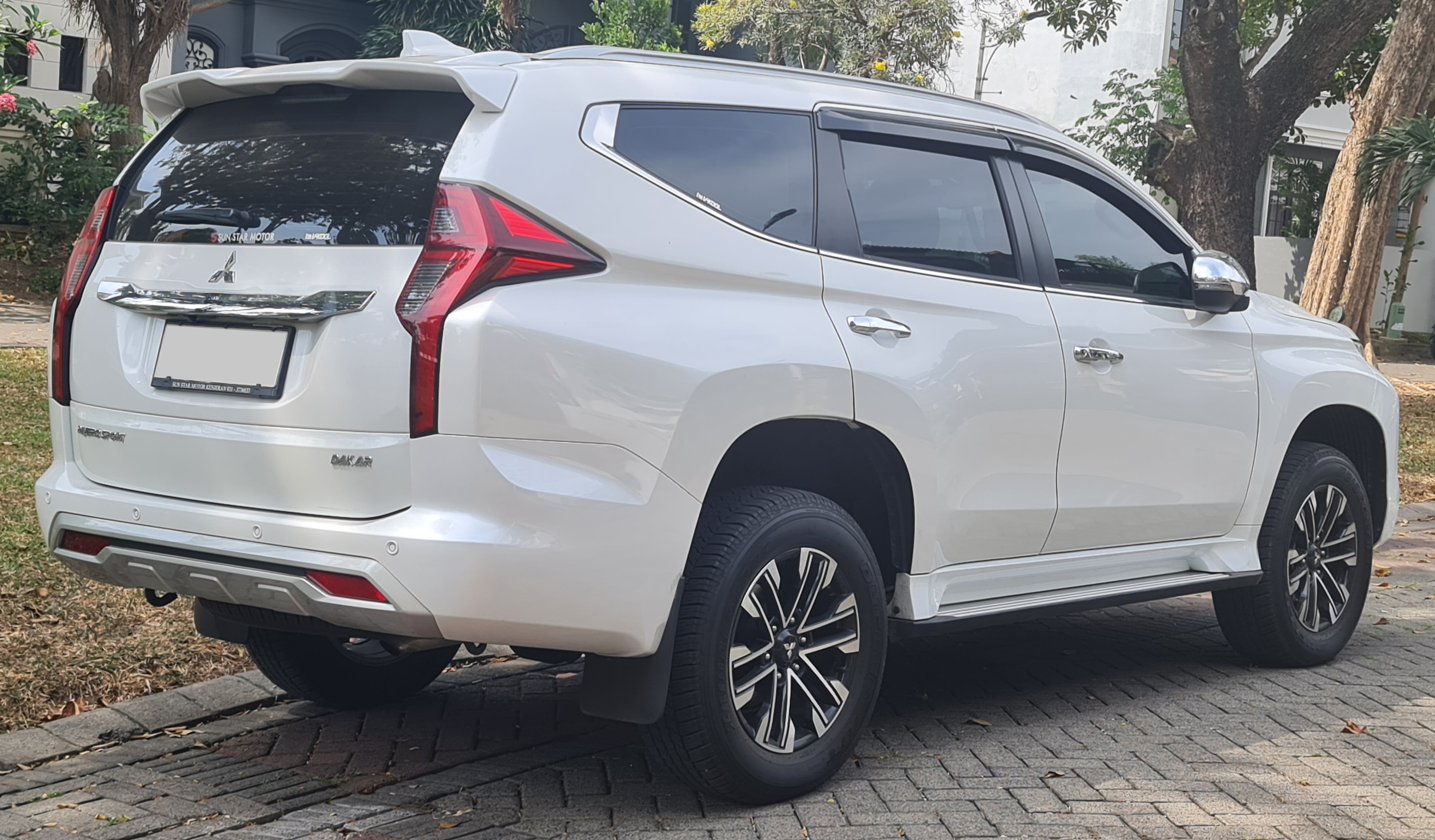
2023 Pajero Sport Dakar 4x2 (first facelift, Indonesia)

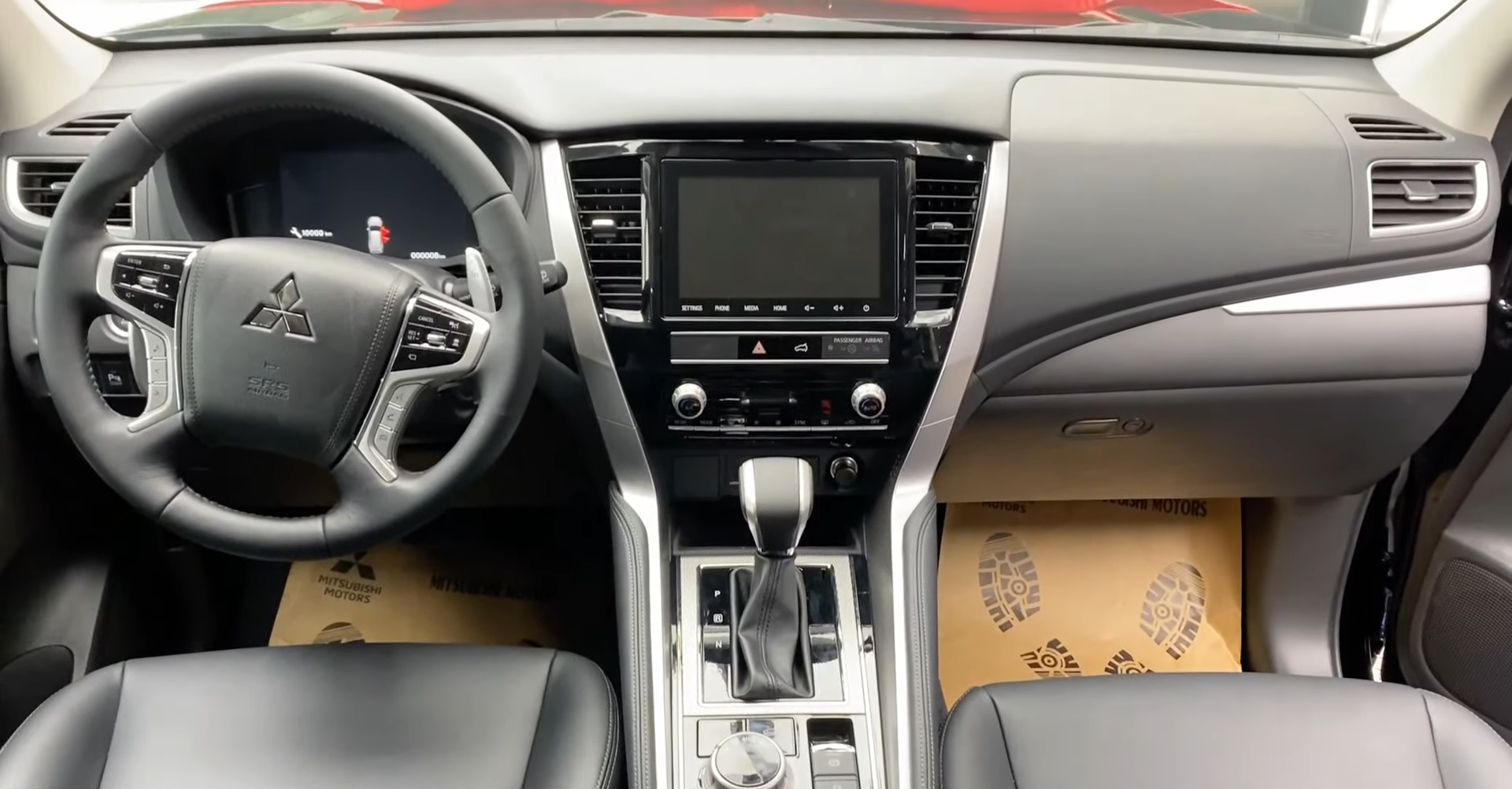
Interior (first facelift)

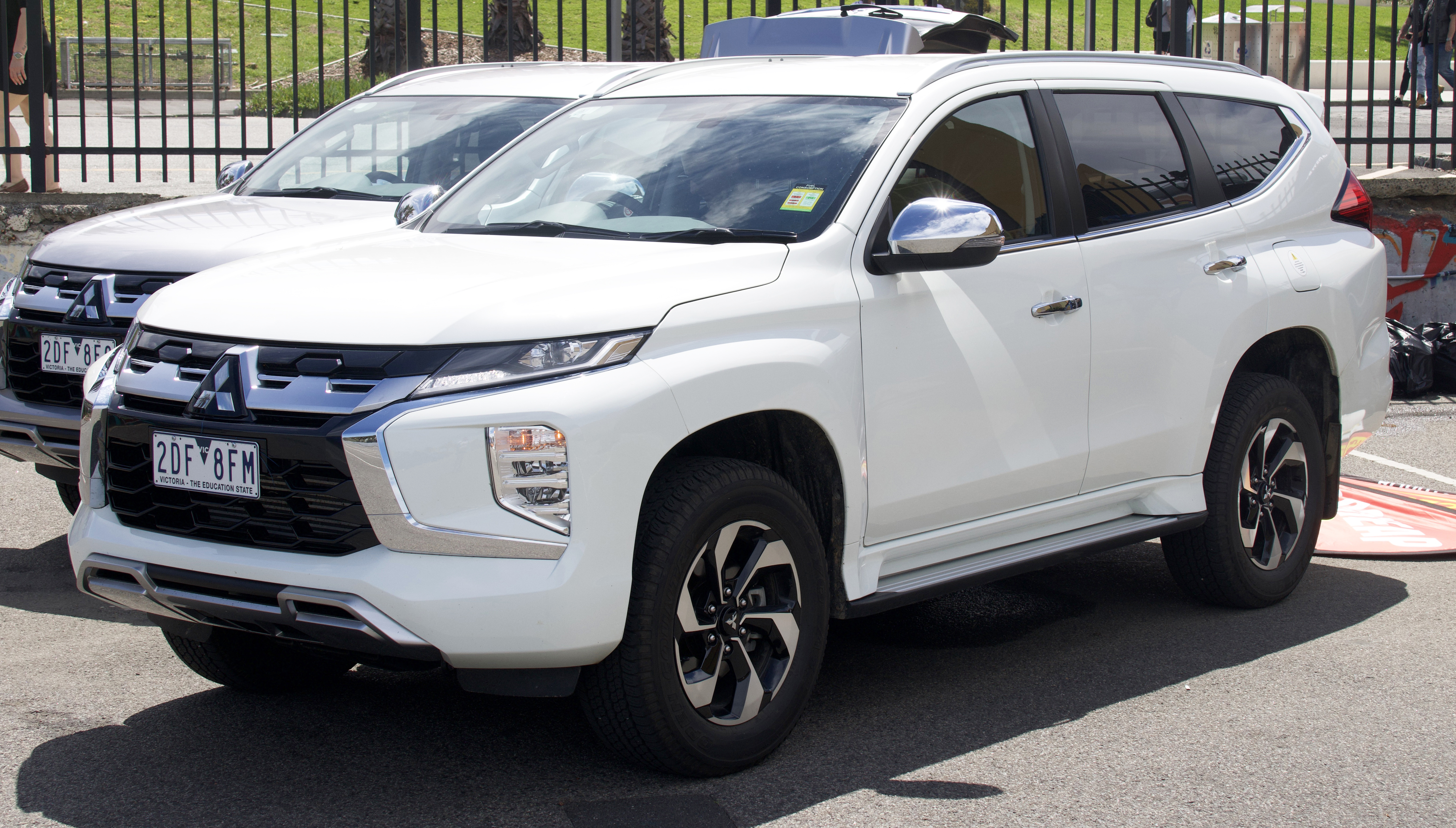
2024 Pajero Sport GLS (second facelift, Australia)

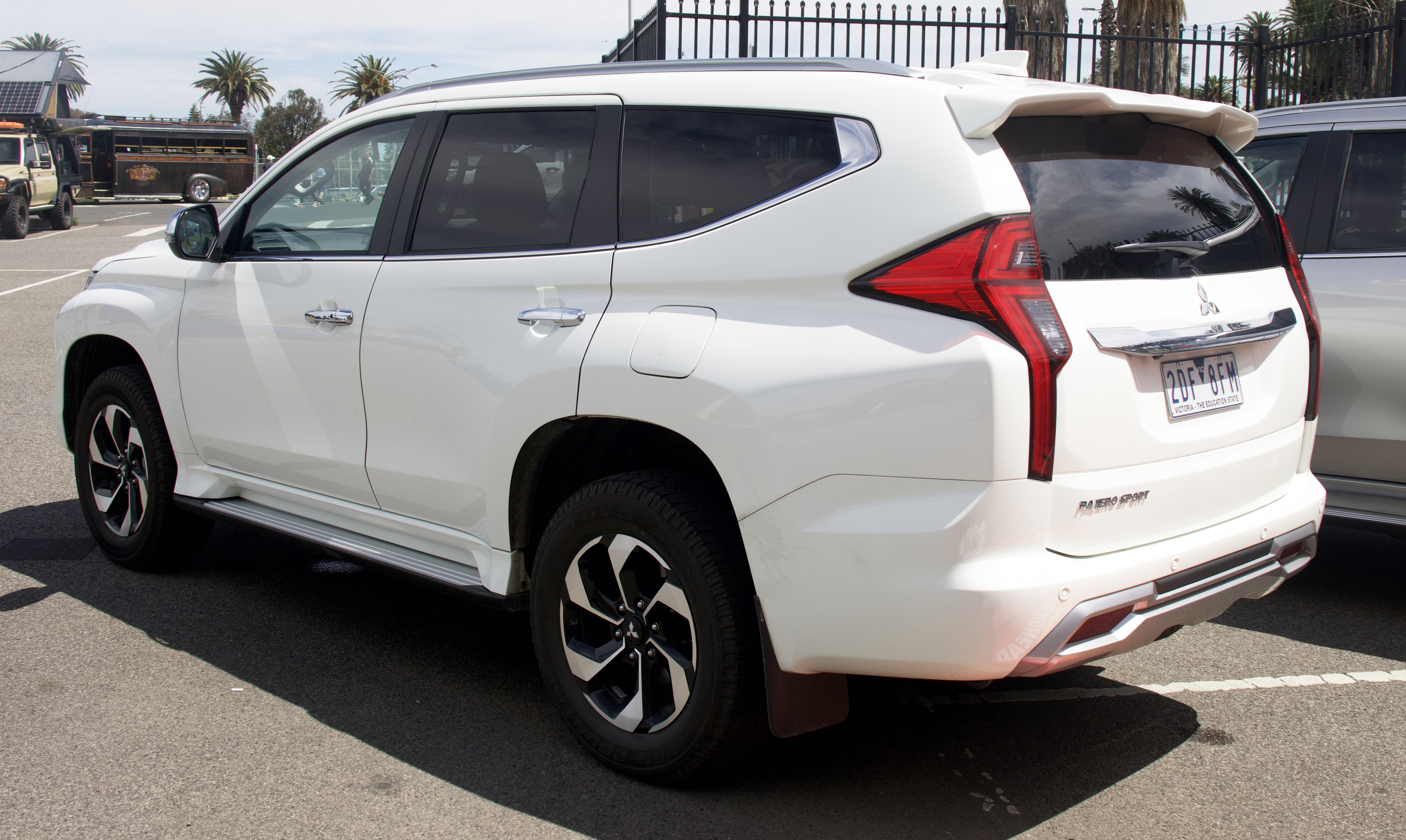
2024 Pajero Sport GLS (second facelift, Australia)

=== Safety ===
The Thai-made Montero Sport in its most basic Latin American market configuration received 5 stars for adult occupants and 3 stars for toddlers from Latin NCAP 1.0 in 2015.

ANCAP test results* Mitsubishi Pajero Sport (2015)
Test	Score
Overall	5 /5 stars
Frontal offset	15.22/16
Side impact	16/16
Pole	2/2
Seat belt reminders	3/3
Whiplash protection	Good
Pedestrian protection	Adequate
Electronic stability control	Standard

ASEAN NCAP test results Mitsubishi Pajero Sport (2015)
Test	Points	Stars
Adult occupant:	15.29	4 /5 stars
Child occupant:	76%	4 /5 stars
Safety assist:	NA	

ASEAN NCAP test results Mitsubishi Pajero Sport (2015)
Test	Points	Stars
Adult occupant:	15.29	5 /5 stars
Child occupant:	76%	4 /5 stars
Safety assist:	NA	

Latin NCAP 1.5 test results Mitsubishi Montero Sport + 3 Airbags (2015, similar to Euro NCAP 2002)
Test	Points	Stars
Adult occupant:	16.70/17.0	5 /5 stars
Child occupant:	31.04/49.00	3 /5 stars

== Annual production ==
Fiscal Year	Production			
Fiscal Year	Japan	Brazil	Thailand	Indonesia
1996	35,561	-	-	-
1997	51,594	-	-	-
1998	71,562	-	-	-
1999	95,914	-	-	-
2000	92,475	-	-	-
2001	78,337	-	-	-
2002	69,001	-	-	-
2003	34,258	-	-	-
2004	30,515	-	-	-
2005	23,773	600	-	-
2006	17,455	5,370	-	-
2007	19,349	6,120	11	-
2008	9,210	4,470	15,065	-
2009	2,364	4,560	37,179	-
2010	2,154	1,380	55,289	-
2011	42	-	67,966	-
2012	-	-	82,712	-
2013	-	-	49,438	-
2014	-	-	42,207	-
2015	-	-	68,361	-
2016	-	-	59,993	107
2017	-	-	62,201	17,940
2018	-	-	51,411	21,120

(Sources: Facts & Figures 2000, Facts & Figures 2005, Facts & Figures 2008, Facts & Figures 2010, Facts & Figures 2013, Facts & Figures 2018, Facts & Figures 2019, Mitsubishi Motors website)

== Sales ==
Year	Thailand	Philippines	Indonesia	Australia	Malaysia (Note: Figures based on registration, may include grey imports and used car imports (Malaysia))	Mexico
2000					1,812	
2001					1,590	
2002					1,804	
2003					985	
2004					576	
2005					204	962
2006					32	736
2007					69	518
2008					19	152
2009			3,298		485	339
2010			11,024		1,446	536
2011			13,212		1,589	413
2012			13,936		1,298	391
2013			12,908		1,018	293
2014	6,394		11,867		714	246
2015	18,975		10,805	997	372	194
2016	15,592	10,768	19,124	6,238	190	69
2017	14,454	19,917	20,239	7,618	105	56
2018	12,932	16,148	20,975	6,566	9	371
2019	13,558	12,861	18,238	6,477	12	300
2020	9,342	5,775	9,344	6,017	1	599
2021	7,273	4,195	16,996	6,804	6	288
2022	7,405		20,285	8,838	5	440
2023	4,169		13,118	5,547	2	276
2024	2,237	10,687	12,723	7,306	2	150
2025			10,014	6,052	1	
