= MMC Automotriz =

MMC Automotriz S.A.
- Type: Corporación anónima
- Industry: Motor vehicles
- Founded: 1990
- Headquarters: Caracas, Venezuela
- Area served: Venezuela
- Key people: Alfredo Orán (President)

MMC Automotriz S.A. is an automobile manufacturer from Venezuela.

== Company history ==
The company is headquartered in Caracas and belonged to Sojitz until the end of 2015. It was founded in 1990. The basis was an agreement between the factory owner CIF and the Japanese group Iwai (predecessor of Sojitz), which increased their initial equity stake of 49% over time to 98%. The production of automobiles by Mitsubishi Motors also started in 1990. The work is located in Barcelona.

On December 10, 2015, "Grupo Sylca", also known as "Grupo Yammine", took over the plant with around 1300 to 1400 employees. On June 1, 2016, Alfredo Orán replaced former President Yoshiro Uero, who had led the company from 2012.

== Vehicles ==
=== Mitsubishi ===
In November 2016, the range included models Mitsubishi Lancer, Mitsubishi Panel and Mitsubishi Montero Sport. The Lancer is 4480 mm long, 1695 mm wide and 1445 mm high at 2600 mm wheelbase. The choices are four-cylinder engine with 1584 cc and 103 horsepower, and 1999 cc displacement and 123 horsepower. The panel is a panel van. Its wheelbase measures 2435 mm. It is 4590 mm long, 1690 mm wide and 1970 mm high since 2-liter engine makes 114 hp. The Montero Sport at 2800 mm wheelbase is 4695 mm long, 1815 mm wide and 1840 mm high. Its V6 engine delivers 220 horsepower from 2998 cc displacement. In addition, commercial vehicles are offered by Fuso.

=== Hyundai ===
In 1996, the assembly of vehicles from Hyundai Motor Company was added. Other sources point to MAV – Automotriz Hyundai or Hyundai MMC Automotriz, SA as manufacturer of Hyundai vehicles.
