= Mitsubishi 6B3 engine =

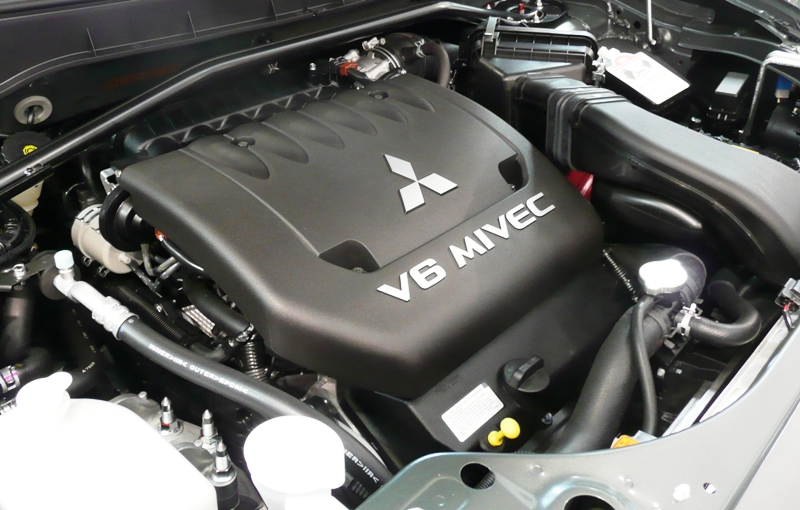

Overview
- Manufacturer: Mitsubishi Motors
- Production: 2005–2021

Layout
- Configuration: Naturally aspirated 60° V6
- Displacement: 3.0 L (2,998 cc)
- Cylinder bore: 87.6 mm (3.45 in)
- Piston stroke: 82.9 mm (3.26 in)
- Cylinder block material: Aluminum die cast
- Cylinder head material: Aluminum die cast
- Valvetrain: Roller rocker arm, SOHC, 24 valves MIVEC (valve timing & lift switching type), auto lash adjuster (exhaust only)
- Compression ratio: 9.5:1-10.5:1

Combustion
- Fuel system: Multi-point fuel injection
- Fuel type: Gasoline
- Cooling system: Water-cooled

Output
- Power output: 220–230 PS (162–169 kW; 217–227 hp)
- Torque output: 276–291 N⋅m (204–215 lb⋅ft)

Chronology
- Predecessor: Mitsubishi 6G7 engine

The Mitsubishi 6B3 engine is a range of all-alloy piston V6 engines developed by Mitsubishi Motors. Currently, only one engine has been developed, a 3.0 L (2,998 cc) V6 first introduced in the North American version of the second generation Mitsubishi Outlander which debuted in October 2006.

All engines developed within this family have aluminum cylinder block and head with iron cylinder liners, 4 valves per cylinder and MIVEC variable valve timing.

== 6B31 ==
=== Specifications ===
Engine type — V6 cylinder, 60 degrees, SOHC 24v, MIVEC
Displacement — 3.0 L (2,998 cc)
Bore x Stroke — 87.6 mm × 82.9 mm (3.45 in × 3.26 in)
Compression ratio — 9.5:1, 10.5:1 from 2010 on
Power — 220 PS (162 kW; 217 hp) at 6250 rpm, 230 PS (169 kW; 227 hp) from 2010 on
Torque — 276 N⋅m (204 lb⋅ft) at 4000 rpm, 291 N⋅m (215 lb⋅ft) from 2010 on
MIVEC switch — at 4750 rpm

=== Applications ===
- 2007–2020 Mitsubishi Outlander
- 2012–2021 Mitsubishi Pajero Sport

=== Characteristics ===
- The first of the main strategies used to achieve high output and low fuel consumption was to improve air intake efficiency by applying the MIVEC system (valve timing & lift switching-type), and also optimizing the intake/exhaust-ports in the cylinder head, and employing a variable intake manifold. The second strategy was to reduce mechanical friction by using an offset crankshaft and other technologies. The third strategy was to improve anti-knocking performance by more efficient cooling of the cylinder head/combustion chambers. The fourth strategy was to adopt twin knock sensors (for sensing & control in each bank) to optimize combustion.
- The 6B31 features an aluminum variable intake manifold that uses a resin-made 2-stage Induction Control Valve to provide the benefits of short and long intake tracts, automatically switching in response to engine speed. A flap inside the Induction Control Valve remains closed below 3,600 rpm, forcing the intake charge to take a longer route to the inlet valves. Over 3,600 rpm, the flap opens, providing a shorter tract to the valves to increase power. Positioning the EGR distribution inlet on the upper intake manifold, far from the throttle valve, improves real-world fuel consumption by lowering the temperature entering the EGR distribution passageway.
- A sophisticated electronically controlled multi-point fuel injection system ensures precision fuel delivery. The electronic throttle control system (throttle-by-wire) eliminates the mechanical linkage between the accelerator pedal and the throttle plate. Looping the fuel line around the engine improves exhaust gas performance by reducing fuel temperature differences between the delivery pipes, reducing pulsations within the delivery pipes, and suppressing variations in the amount of fuel injected. A combination of the MIVEC – a variable valve timing and lift system – and a two-stage variable intake manifold ensure a broad torque curve. The 6B31 provides nearly 90 percent of peak torque from just 2,000 rpm.
- The emissions of the 6B31 engine were reduced by the following means: optimization of intake/exhaust port design in the cylinder head; improvement in mixture charging efficiency and combustion stability by using the effect of the low-speed cams of MIVEC; improvement in combustion by ultra-fine atomization injectors; and the upstream heat capacity of the catalyst was reduced by adoption of the clamshell type exhaust manifold which has a built-in catalyst to make catalyst activation earlier.
- Another low-emission strategy is reducing the emissions of untreated exhaust gases directly discharged from the engine (or gases upstream of the catalyst) by the following measure: the setting of compression ratio at a rather low ratio of 9.5:1 to optimize the balance between performance and emission level; the reduction of unburned hydrocarbons in exhaust gases by the reduction of the volume of gaps in combustion-chambers where flame cannot propagate.
- The weight of the engine has been reduced by using aluminum die-casting for the cylinder block, cylinder heads and resin materials for the rocker cover and variable intake manifold. Other parts of the engine have also been made lighter, such as the use of a guideless oil level gauge, direct mounting of accessories to the engine block and shape optimization by CAE analysis.
- Low vibration and low noise are achieved by substantial improvement of the flexural rigidity of the powertrain (by higher stiffness of the cylinder block and oil pan), and adoption of auto-tensioner for the accessorydrive-belt, and the MIVEC system for stable combustion. Offsetting the cylinder axis of rotation in the direction of crank rotation reduces operating friction. For the air intake, lengthened ducts and optimized resonators ensure quietness and to reduce weight. A variable-valve main muffler helps reduce noise and vibration.
- For the 2010 model Mitsubishi upped the compression ratio of the Outlander's 6B31 to 10.5:1. This change adds an additional ten-horsepower, 230 PS (169 kW; 227 hp) total and 11 lb⋅ft (15 N⋅m) torque up to 215 lb⋅ft (292 N⋅m) total to the engine's output.

== See also ==
- List of Mitsubishi engines
