= Ivo Groen =

Dutch car designer

Ivo Groen (born 1967) is a Dutch car designer. Previously serving as a designer at Citroën and DS, he is currently serving as Head of Creative Design at Lynk & Co.

== Career ==
Groen was born in Amsterdam in 1967. When he was 13, he immigrated to the United States.

He graduated cum laude from the ArtCenter College of Design with a degree in Transportation Design with honours.

In 1988 Groen moved to France and started his design career with an internship at Renault Design. Motivated by his admiration of the Citroën DS, he would go on to join Citroën where he contributed to the designs of the Activa 2 concept vehicle and the first generations of the C2, C3, C5 and C6 models. Subsequently he became head of PSA Group's Advanced Design studio, contributing to the design of the Citybug-trio (Peugeot 107, Citroën C1 and Toyota Aygo), the Eurovans and Sevel Nord vans, and that of the Citroën C-Crosser/Peugeot 4007.

In 2014, when the DS Automobiles brand was launched, Groen became Vice President Design of the new brand, contributing to the design of the DS 3, DS 4, DS 7 Crossback and DS 9.

In 2021, Groen joined Lynk & Co, becoming Vice President Head of Creative Design.

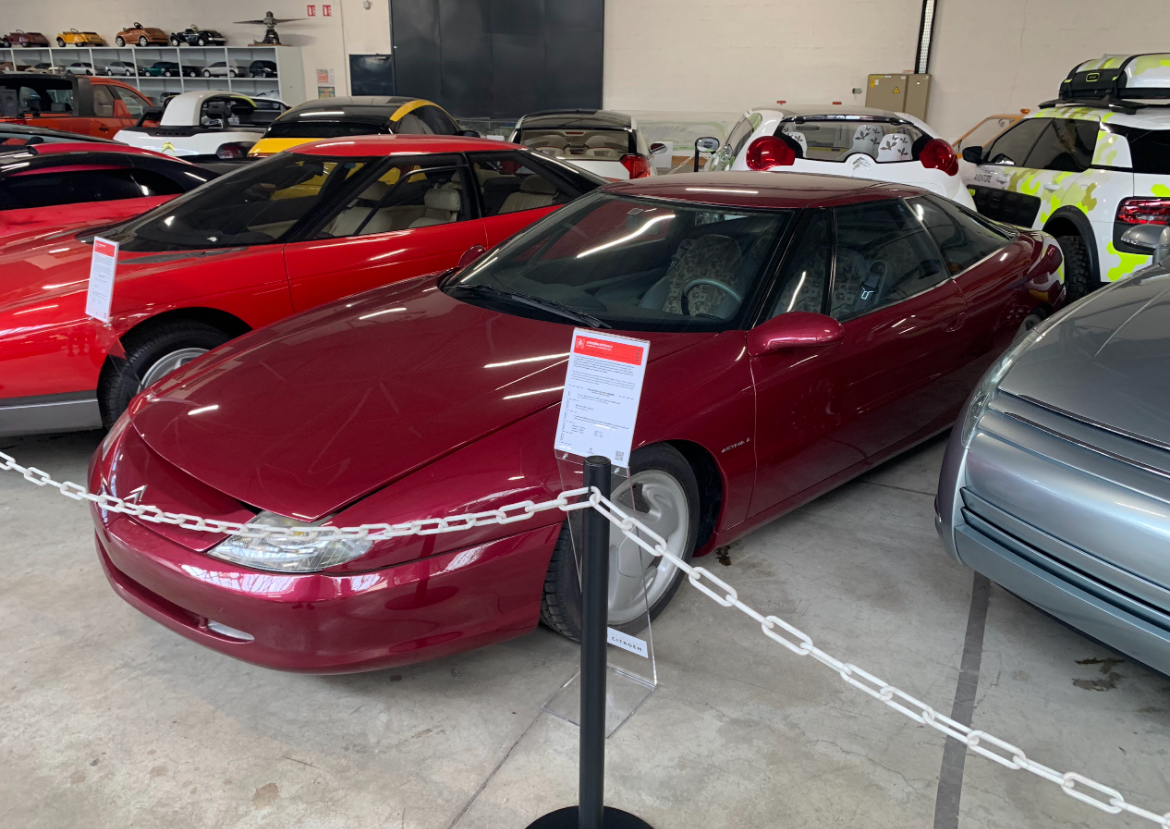
Citroën Activa 2 concept

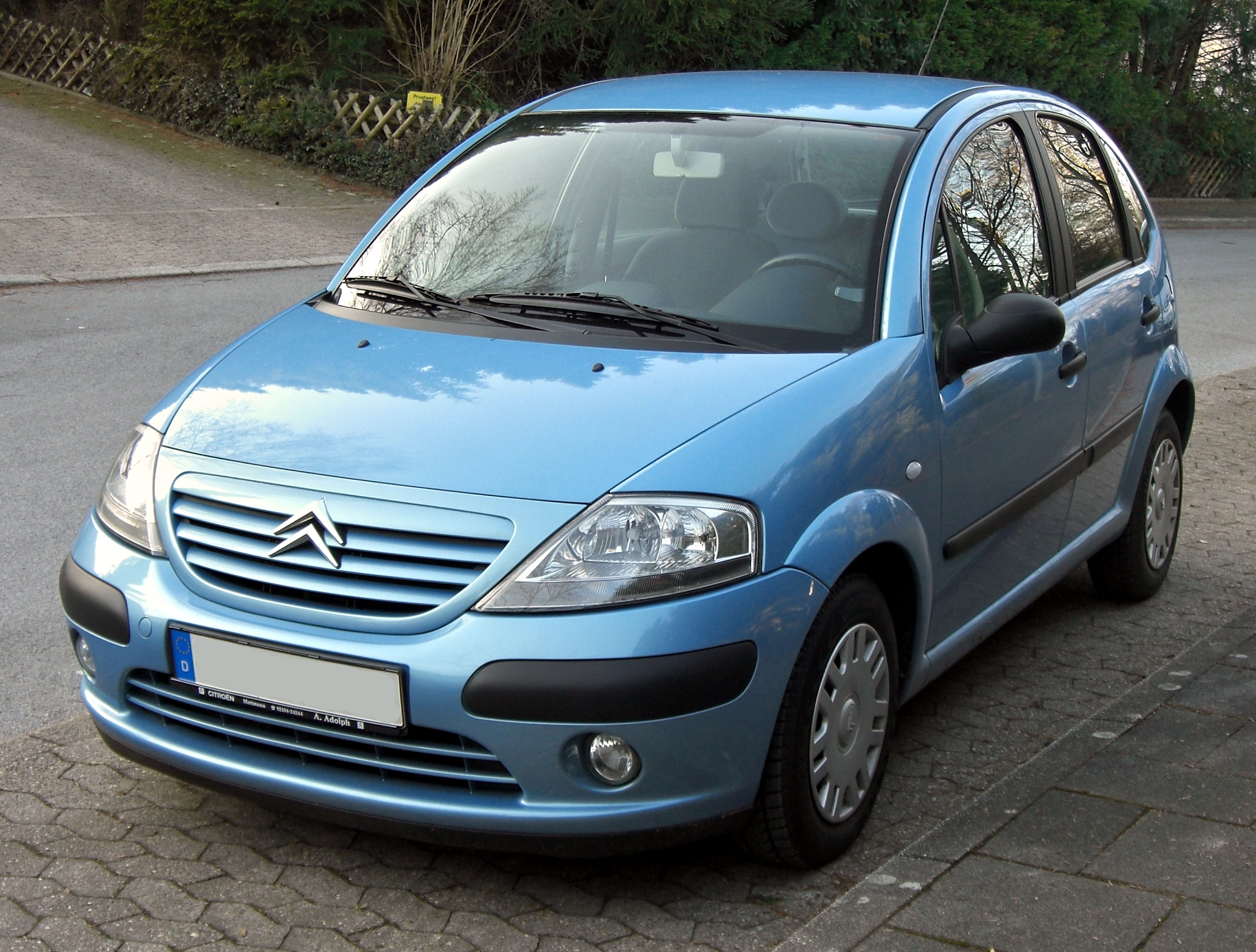
Citroën C3, the first production car designed by Groen.

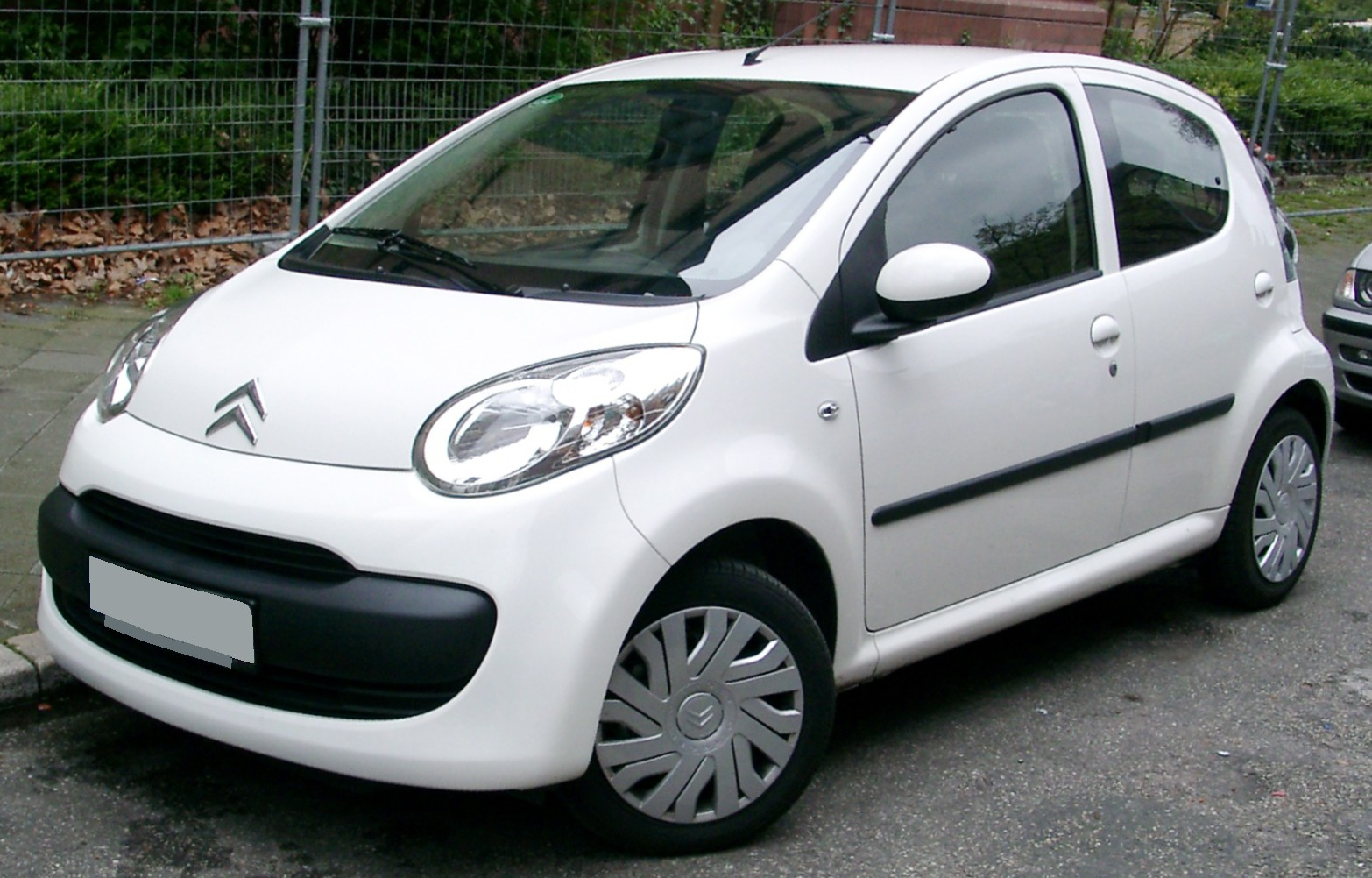
Citroen C1

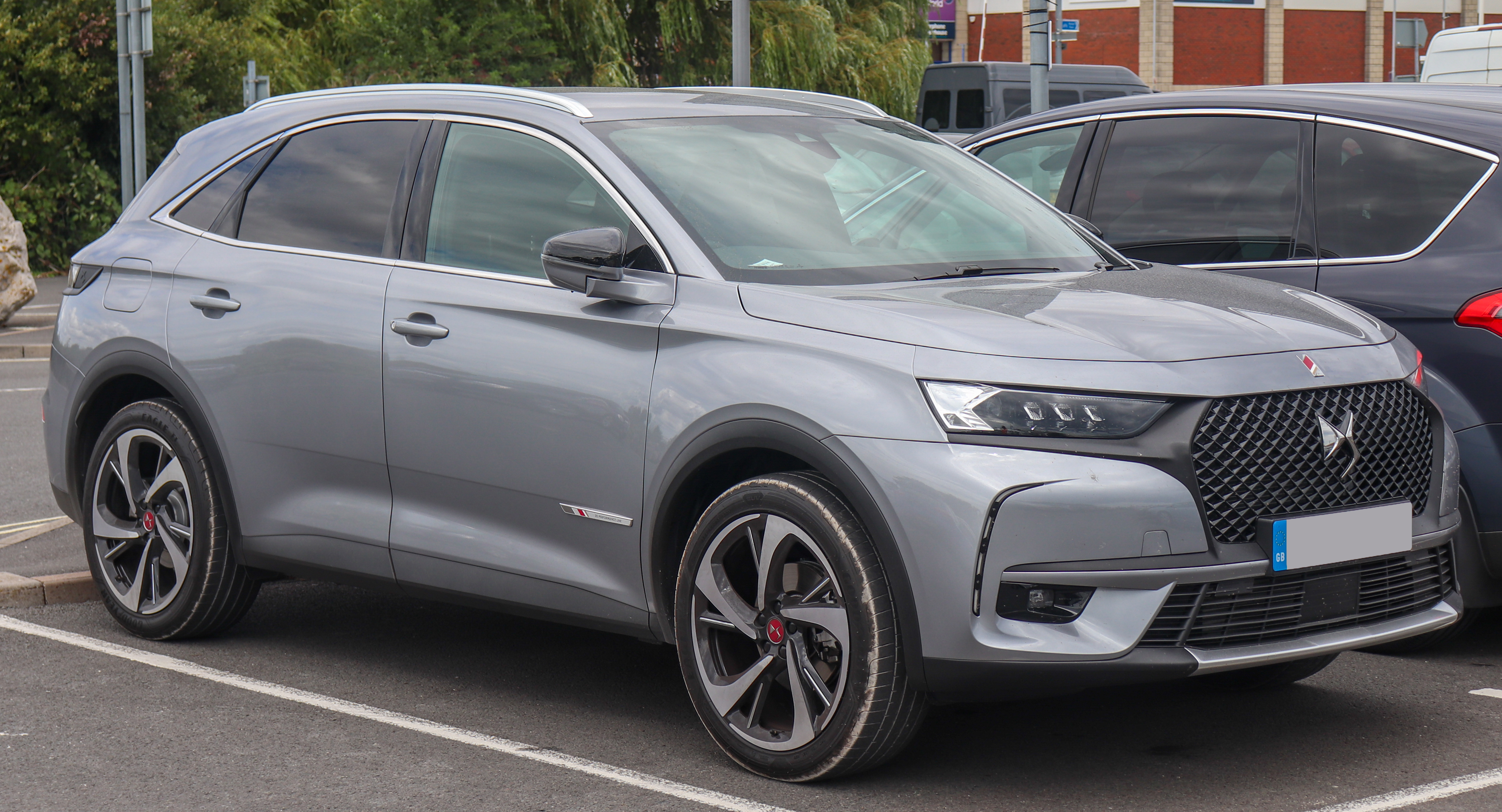
DS 7 Crossback

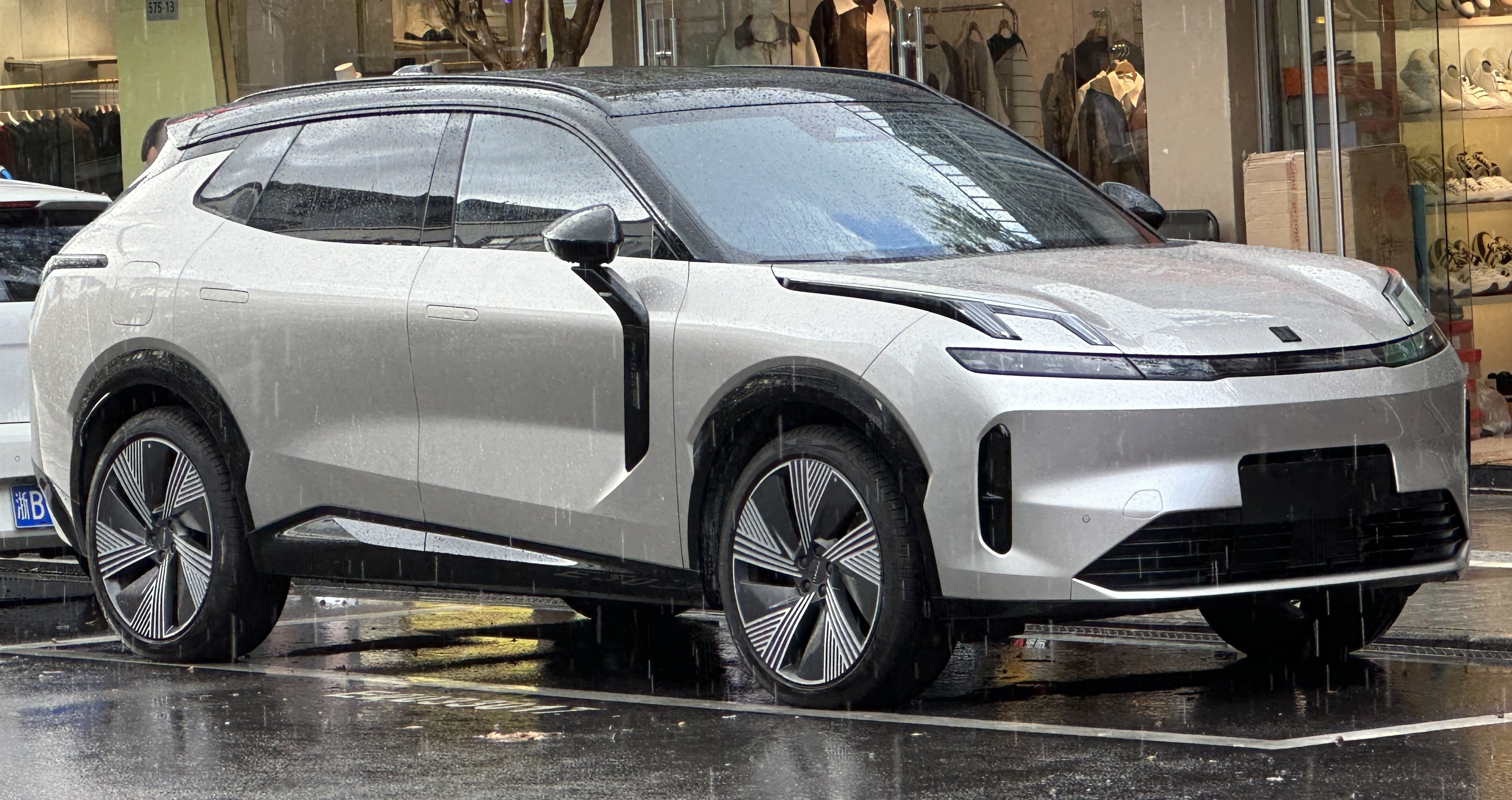
Lynk & Co 08

== Personal life ==
Groen is married and has two children. His hobbies include classic cars: his first car was a Fiat 124 Sport Coupé, he nowadays owns a Lamborghini Espada. He has cited car designers Flaminio Bertoni and André Lefèbvre as inspirations.
