= Mitsubishi GS platform =

Overview
- Manufacturer: Mitsubishi Motors; DaimlerChrysler; Fiat Chrysler Automobiles; PSA Peugeot Citroën; Proton
- Also called: "Project Global"; Chrysler GS platform Chrysler PM/MK & JS platforms
- Production: 2005–present

Body and chassis
- Class: Compact (C); Mid-size (D); Large MPV (M); Compact Crossover (J); Mid-size Crossover (J)
- Layout: Front engine, Front wheel drive/four-wheel drive
- Body styles: 2-door convertible 4-door sedan 5-door SUV; 5-door hatchback 5-door minivan

Powertrain
- Engines: Gasoline/Petrol Engines: Chrysler GEMA I4; Mitsubishi 4B1 I4; Mitsubishi 4A9 I4; PSA EW I4; Mitsubishi 6B3 V6; Chrysler LH V6; Chrysler SOHC V6; Chrysler Pentastar V6; Diesel engines: Mitsubishi 4N1 I4; PSA DW I4; VW 2.0 TDI I4; Mercedes-Benz I4; Fiat 2.0 Multijet I4

Chronology
- Predecessor: Chrysler PL platform Chrysler JR platform
- Successor: Fiat Compact platform (Chrysler products); Renault–Nissan Common Module Family (Mitsubishi products); PSA EMP2 platform (Peugeot products)

The GS platform (also known as "Project Global" by Mitsubishi) is a compact car platform co-developed and shared by Mitsubishi Motors and DaimlerChrysler.

== History ==
After dissolution of the DaimlerChrysler / Mitsubishi partnership in 2004, DaimlerChrysler made substantial changes to the platform subsequently naming it the JS platform for mid-size cars and PM/MK for compact cars.

Mitsubishi's GS vehicles are manufactured in Japan with the exception of the RVR/Outlander Sport, which was manufactured at the former Diamond-Star Motors plant in Normal, Illinois, USA. Mitsubishi's first GS platform car was the 2005 Mitsubishi Outlander crossover SUV.

PM/MK vehicles from Chrysler are assembled at Belvidere Assembly in Belvidere, Illinois (Dodge Caliber and Jeep Compass) and JS Vehicles were produced at the Sterling Heights Assembly (Chrysler 200 and Dodge Avenger).

Chrysler said the 200's predecessor, the Chrysler Sebring, and Avenger did not use the GS platform, though that was their starting point.

== Vehicles ==
=== Mitsubishi ===
- 2006–2021 Mitsubishi Outlander
- 2007–2017 Mitsubishi Lancer
- 2007–present Mitsubishi Delica D:5
- 2008–2016 Mitsubishi Lancer Evolution
- 2010–present Mitsubishi ASX/RVR/Outlander Sport
- 2017–2024 Mitsubishi Grand Lancer
- 2017–present Mitsubishi Eclipse Cross
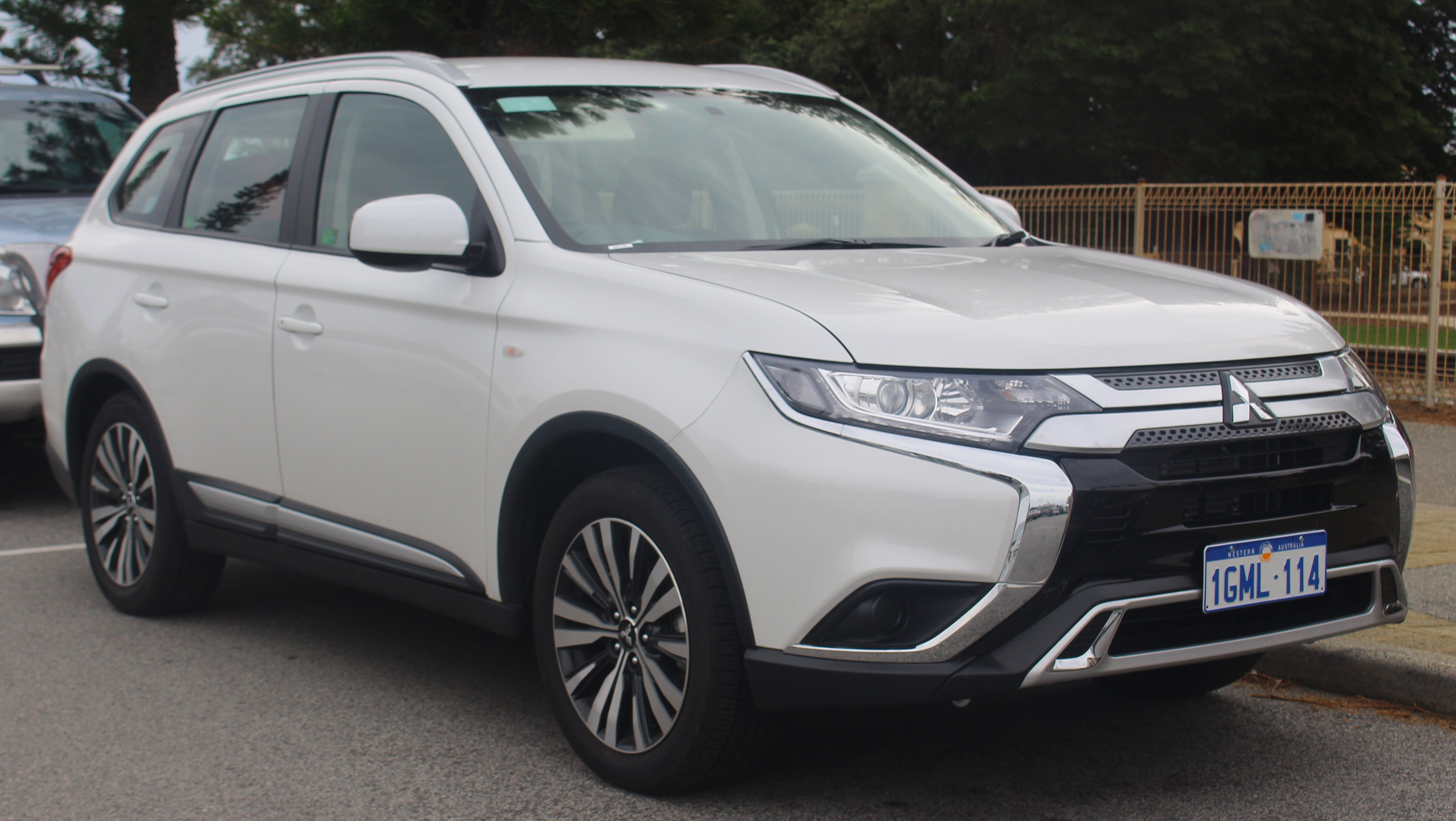
Mitsubishi Outlander

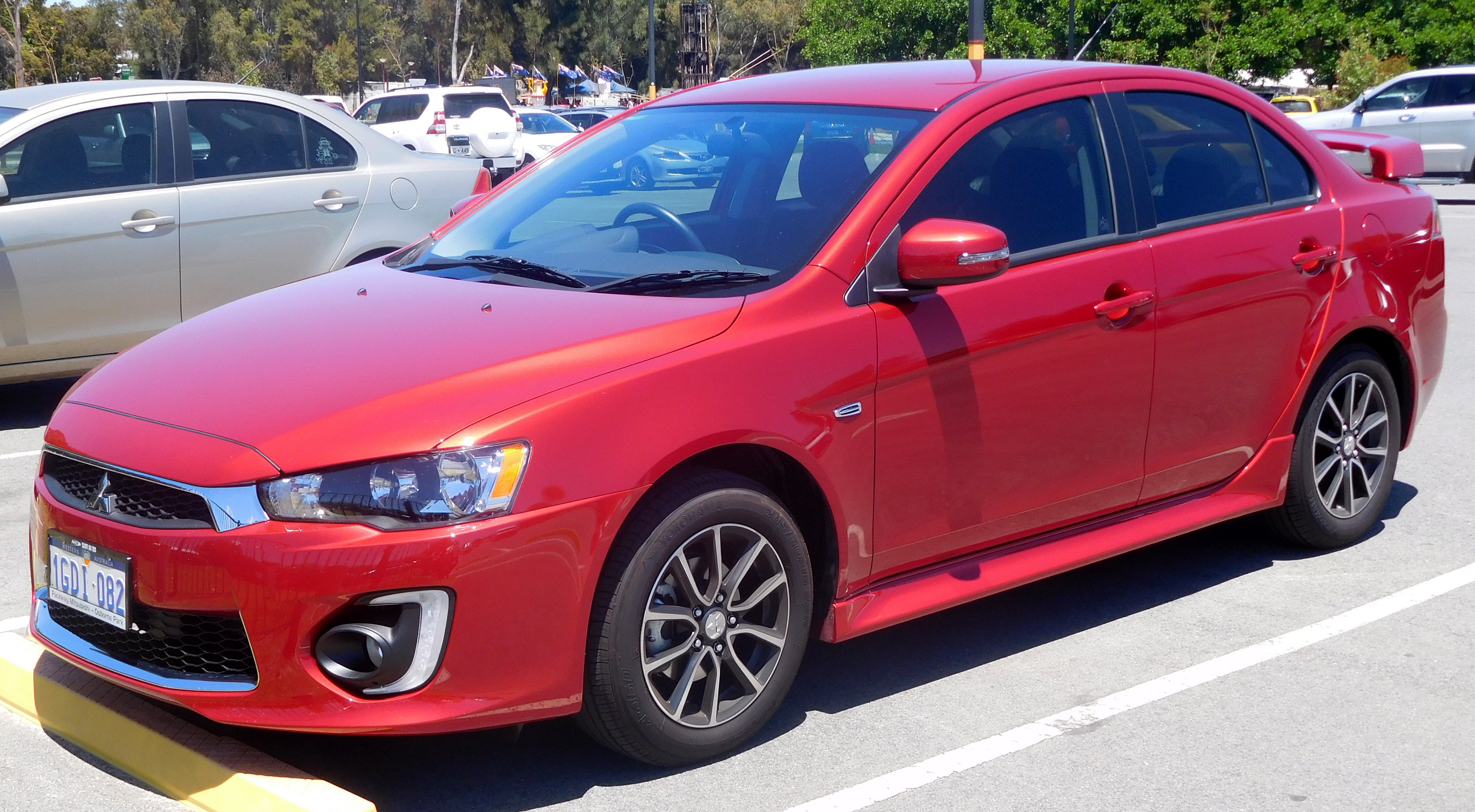
Mitsubishi Lancer

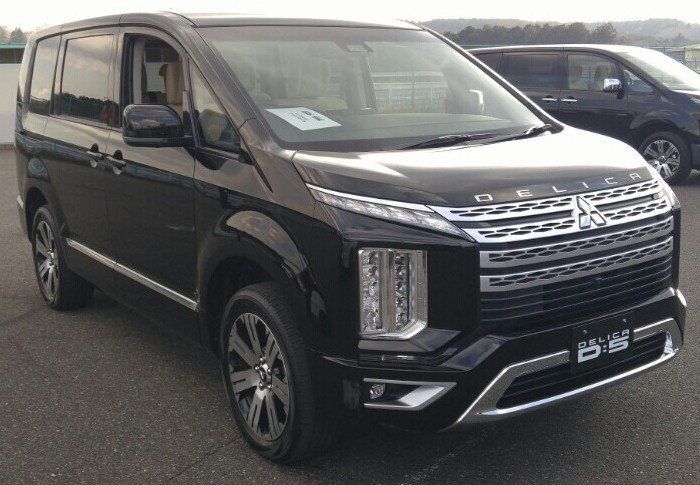
Mitsubishi Delica D:5

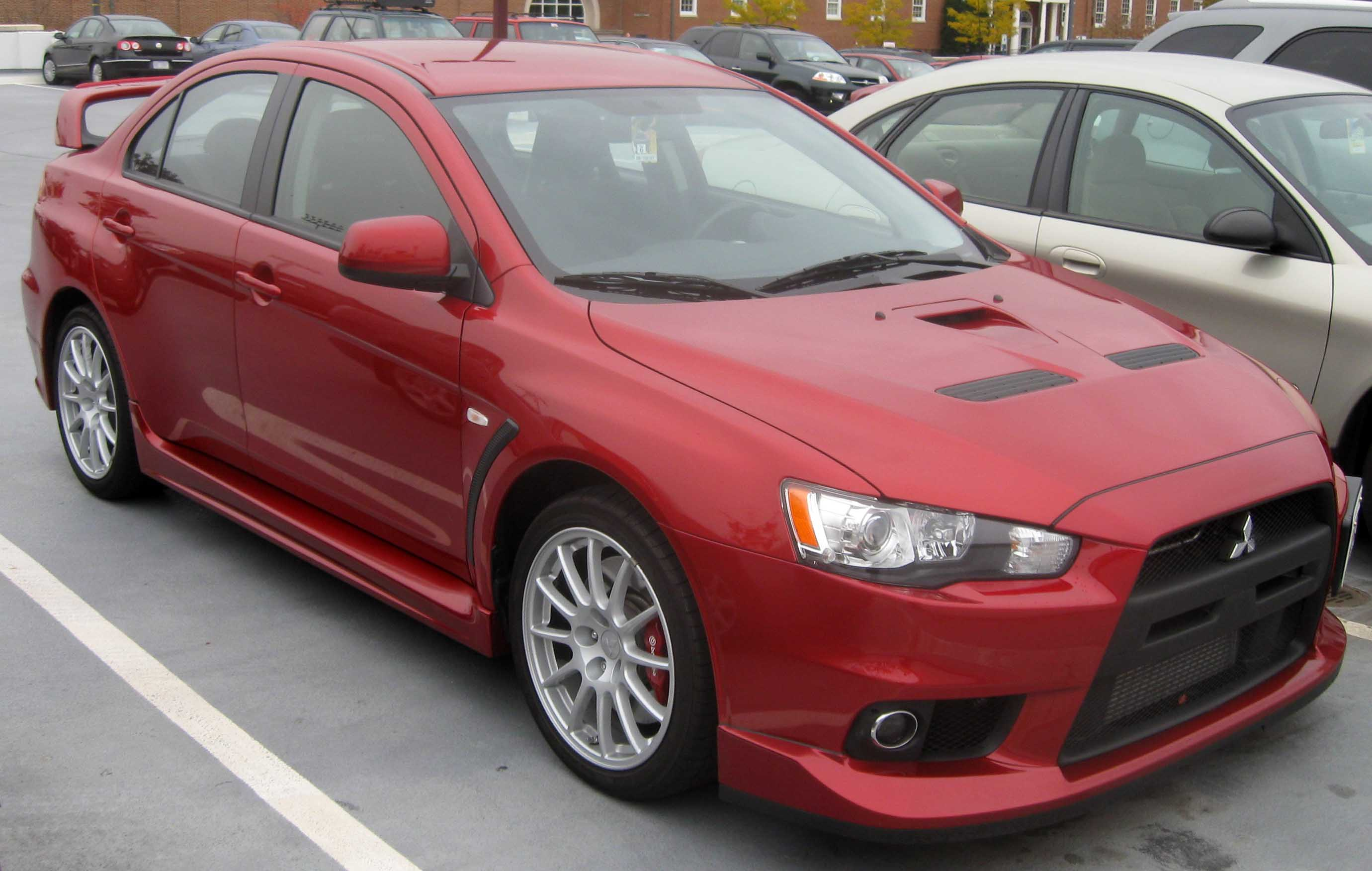
Mitsubishi Lancer Evolution X

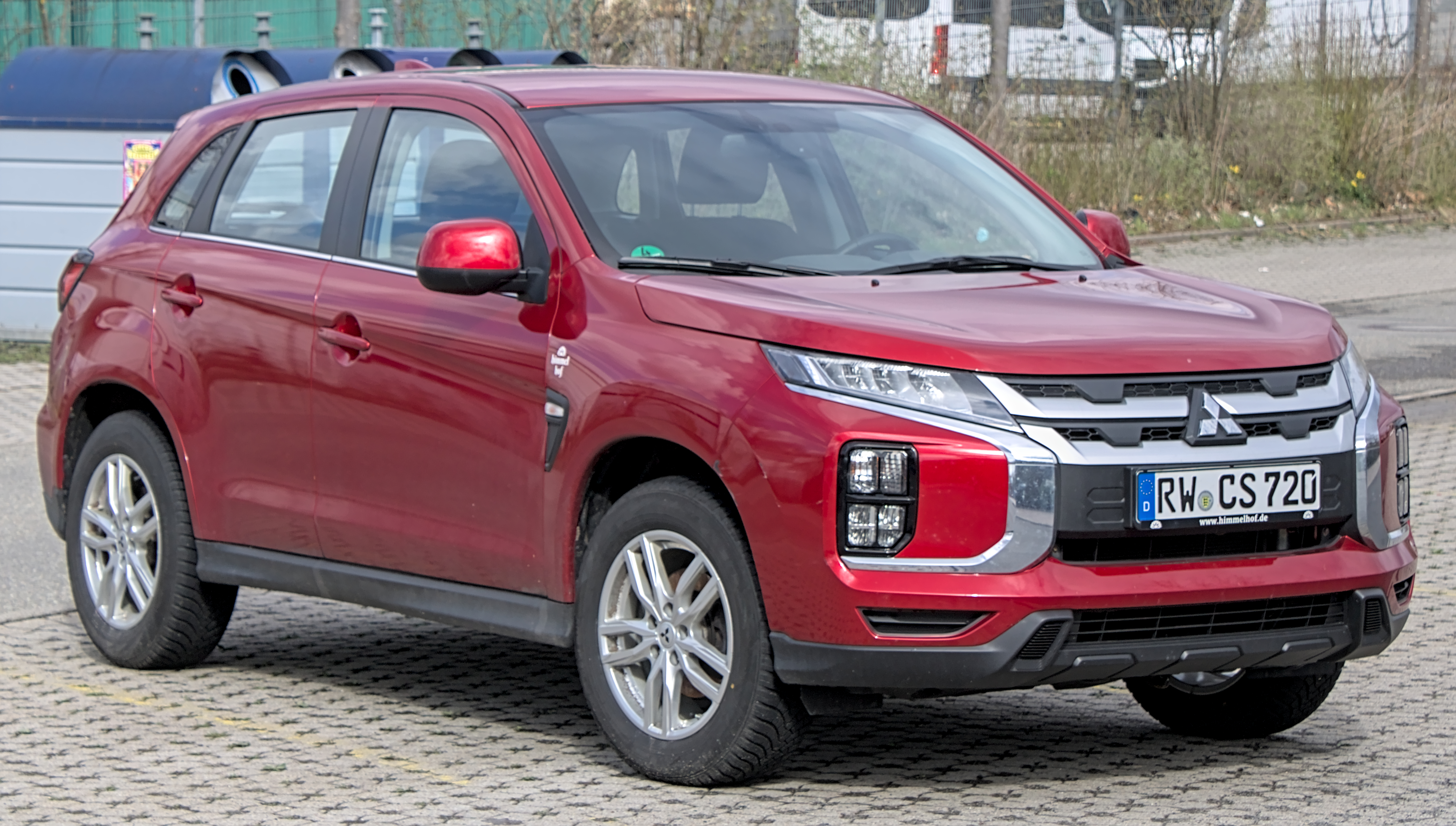
Mitsubishi ASX/RVR/Outlander Sport

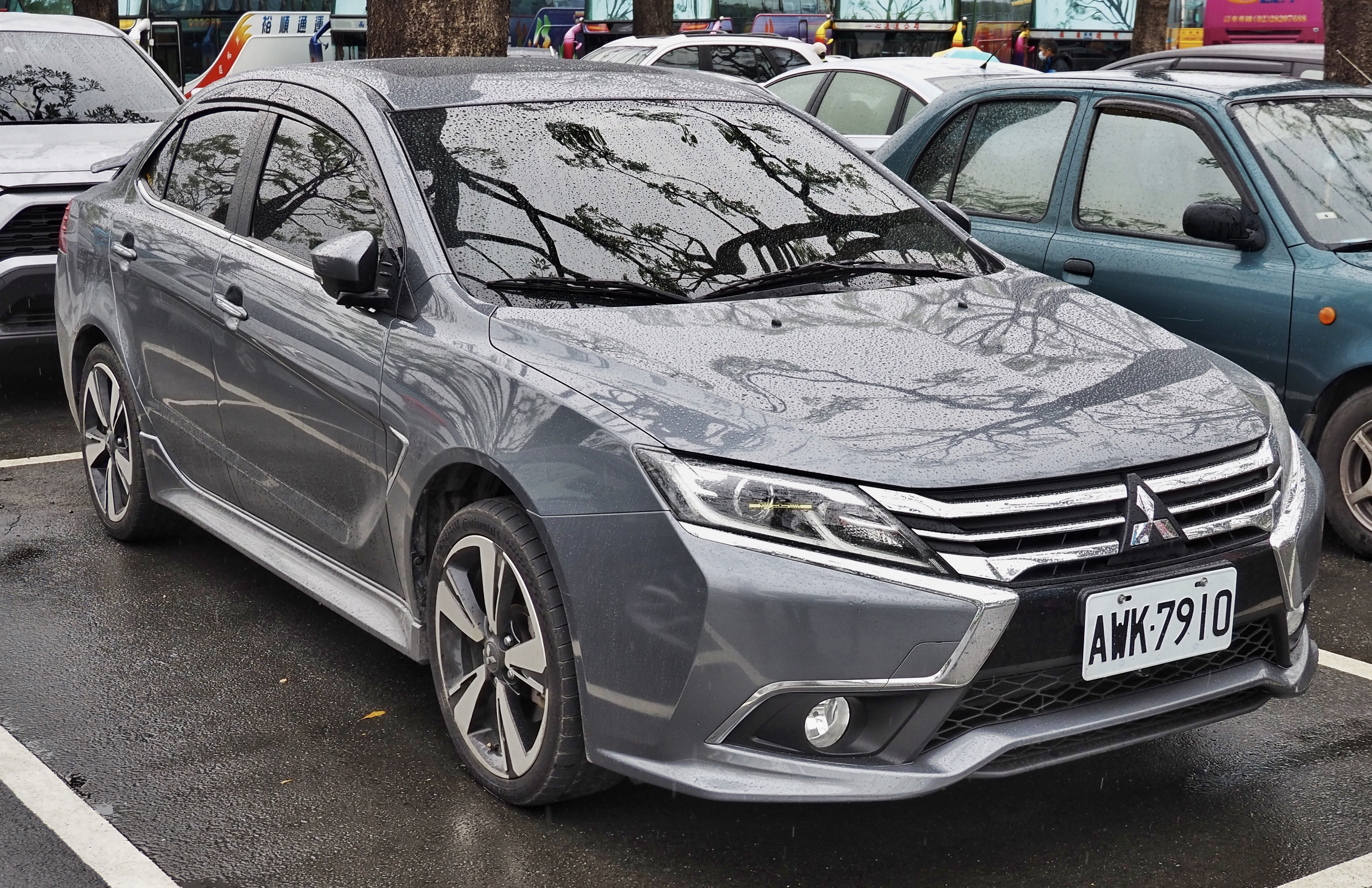
Mitsubishi Grand Lancer

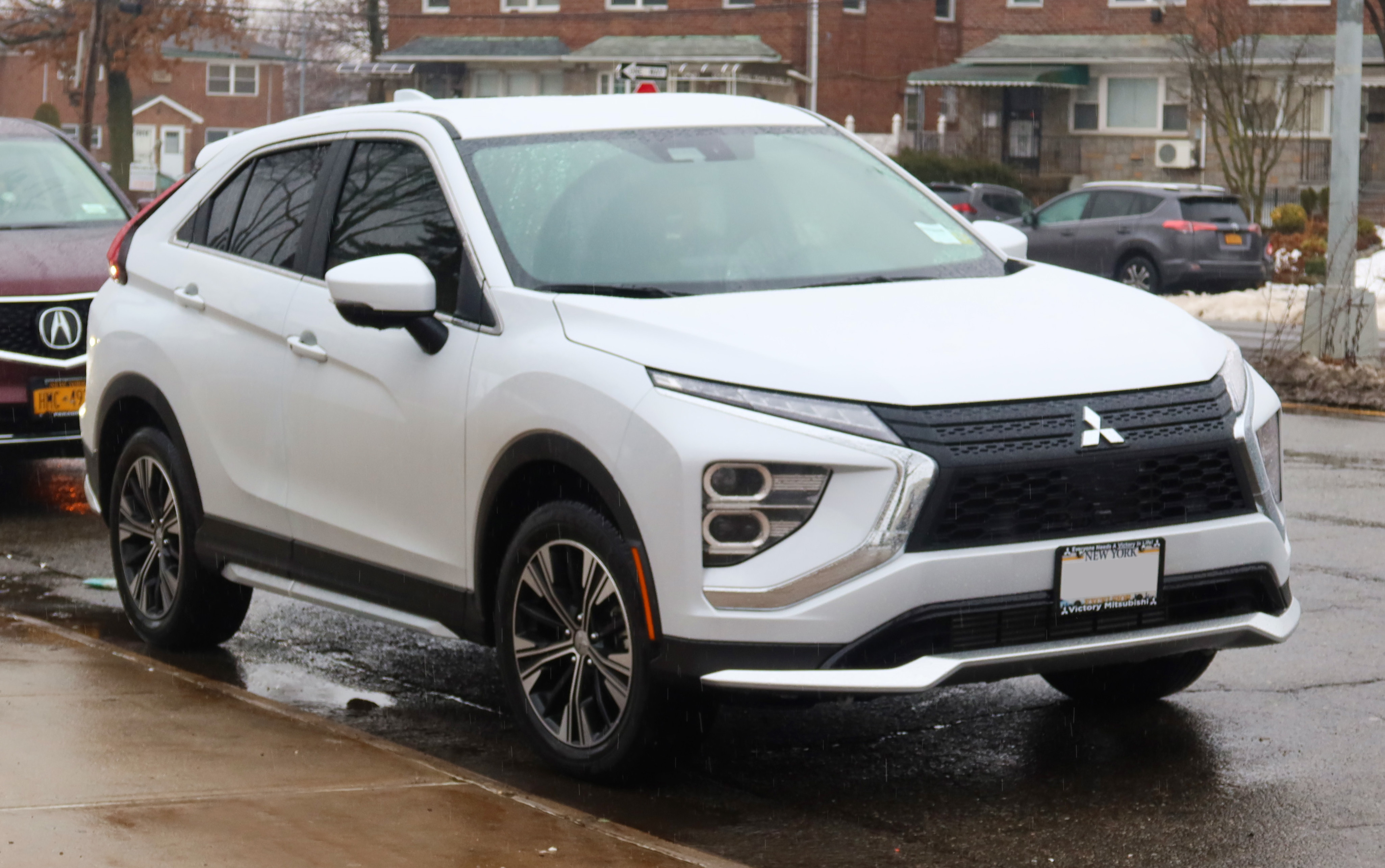
Mitsubishi Eclipse Cross

=== Chrysler/Fiat ===
- 2007–2012 Dodge Caliber (PM)
- 2007–2017 Jeep Compass (MK49)
- 2007–2017 Jeep Patriot (MK74)
- 2007–2010 Chrysler Sebring sedan (JS)
- 2008–2010 Chrysler Sebring Convertible (JS)
- 2008–2014 Dodge Avenger (JS)
- 2009–2020 Dodge Journey/Fiat Freemont (JC49)
- 2011–2014 Chrysler 200/Lancia Flavia (JS)
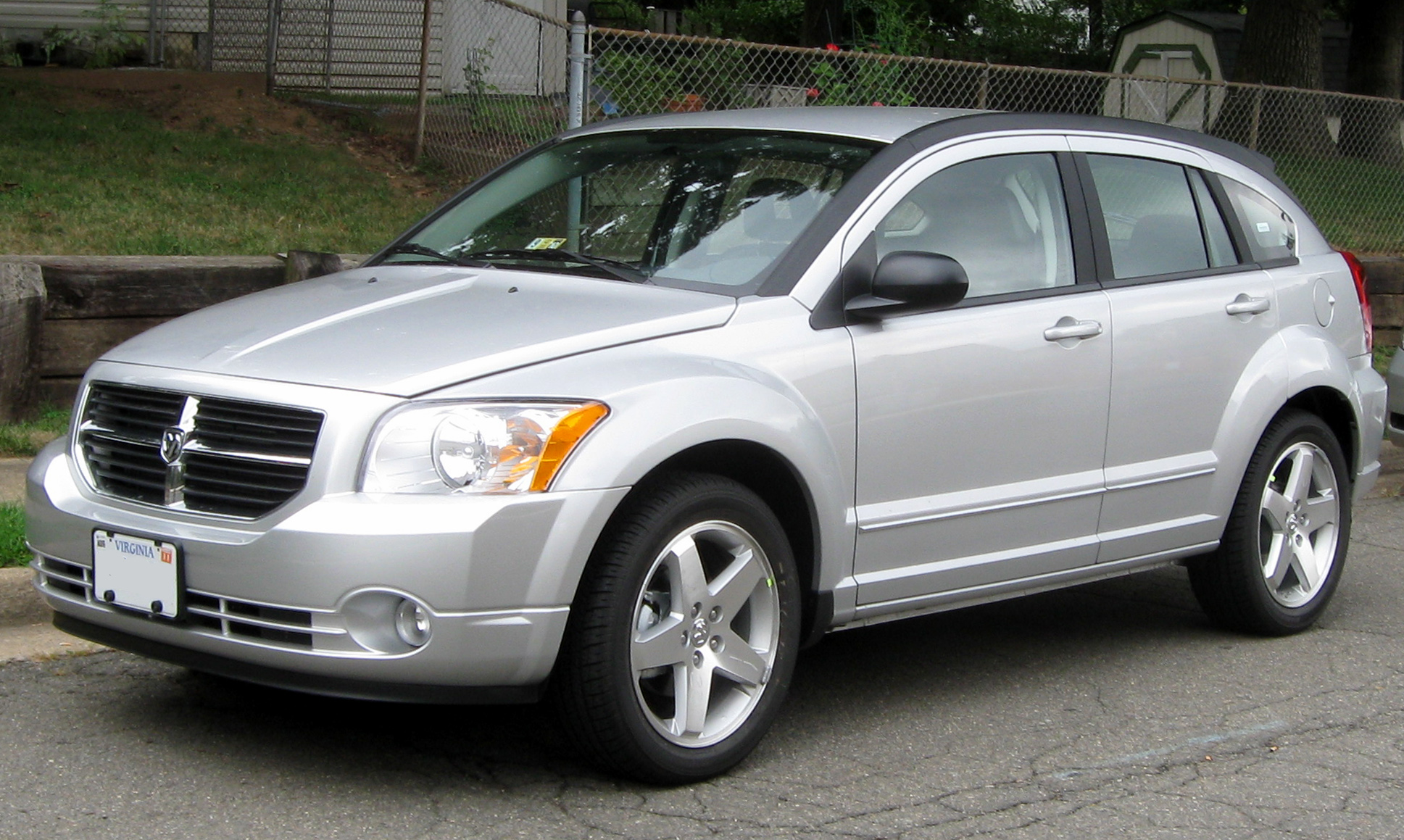
Dodge Caliber

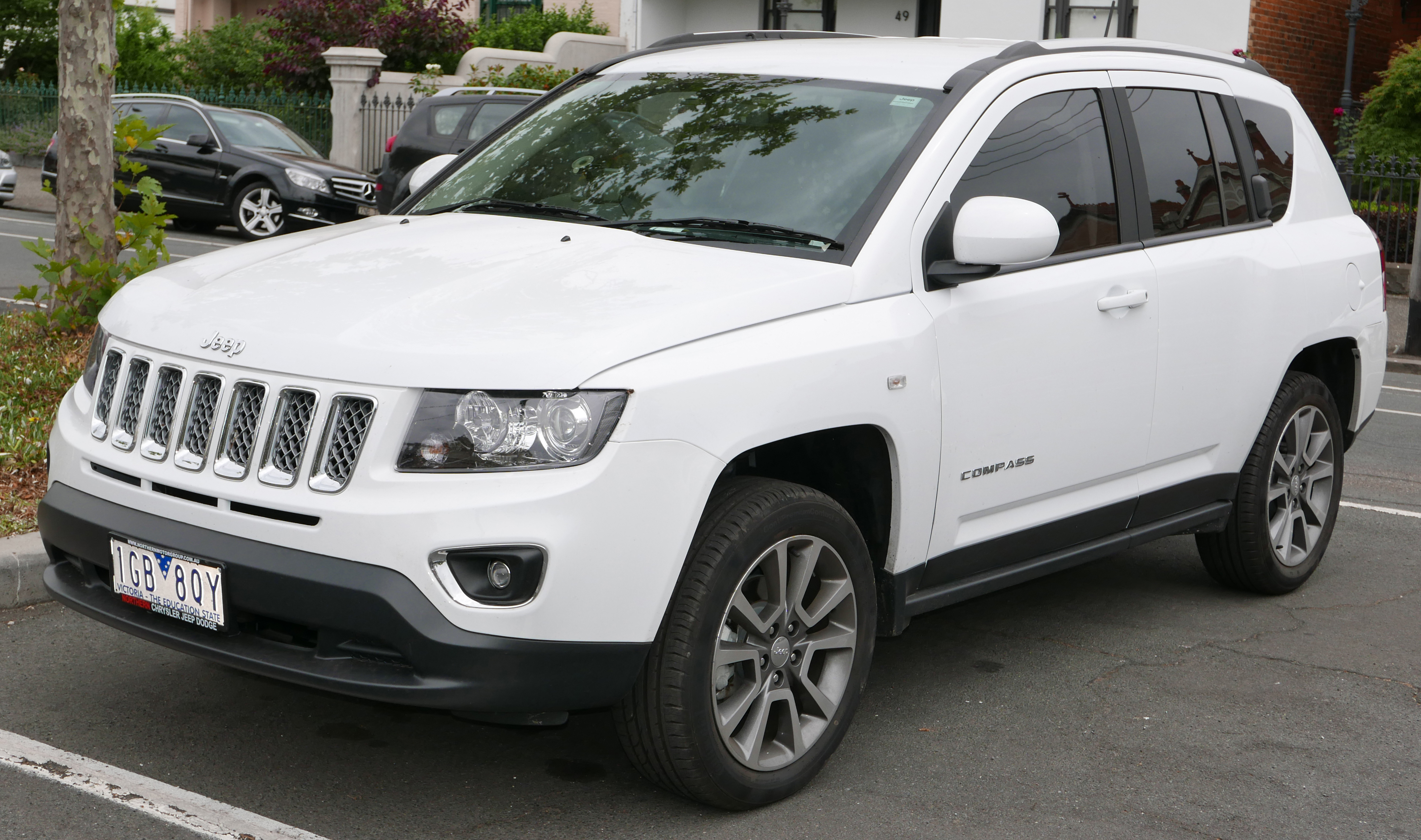
Jeep Compass

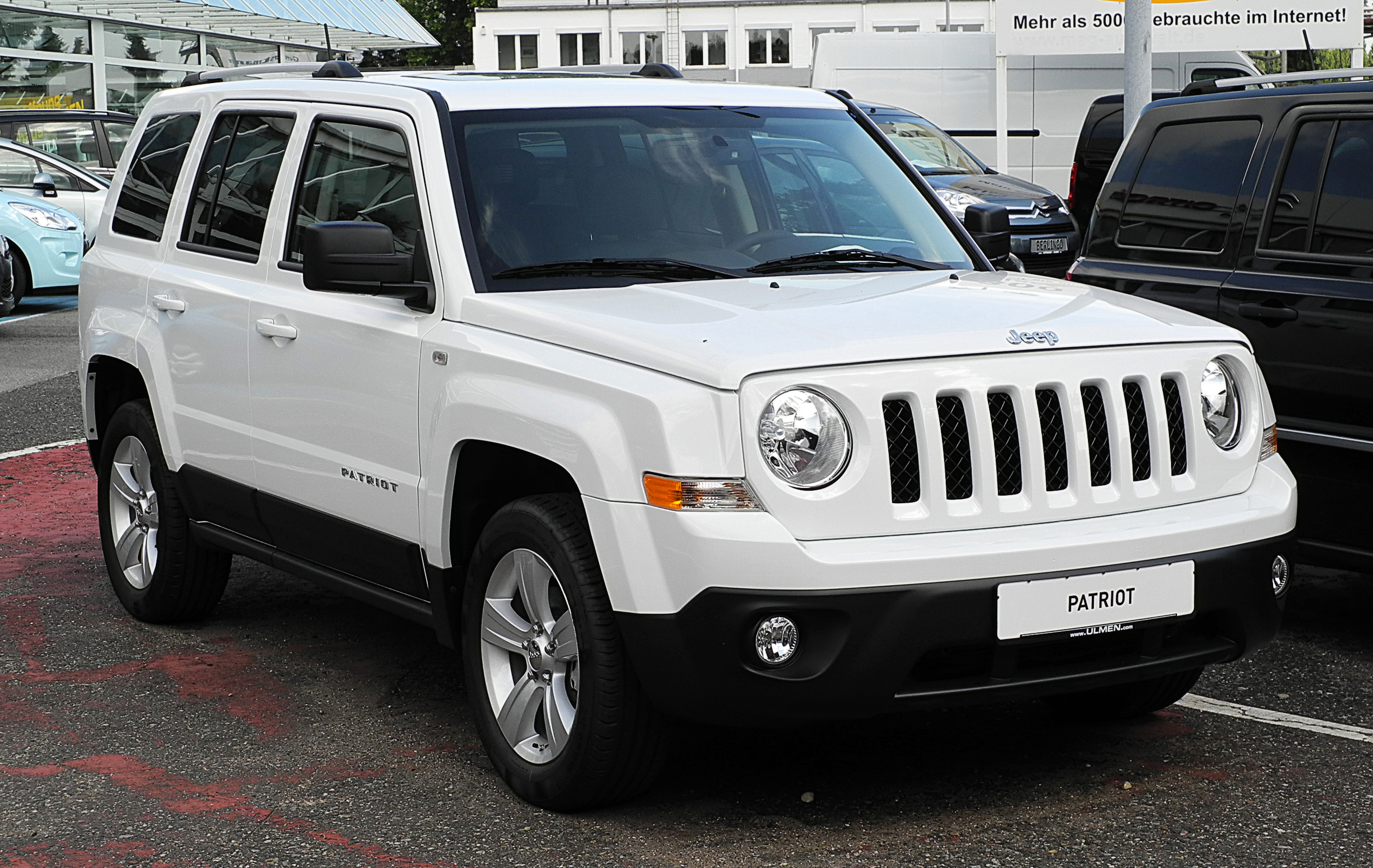
Jeep Patriot

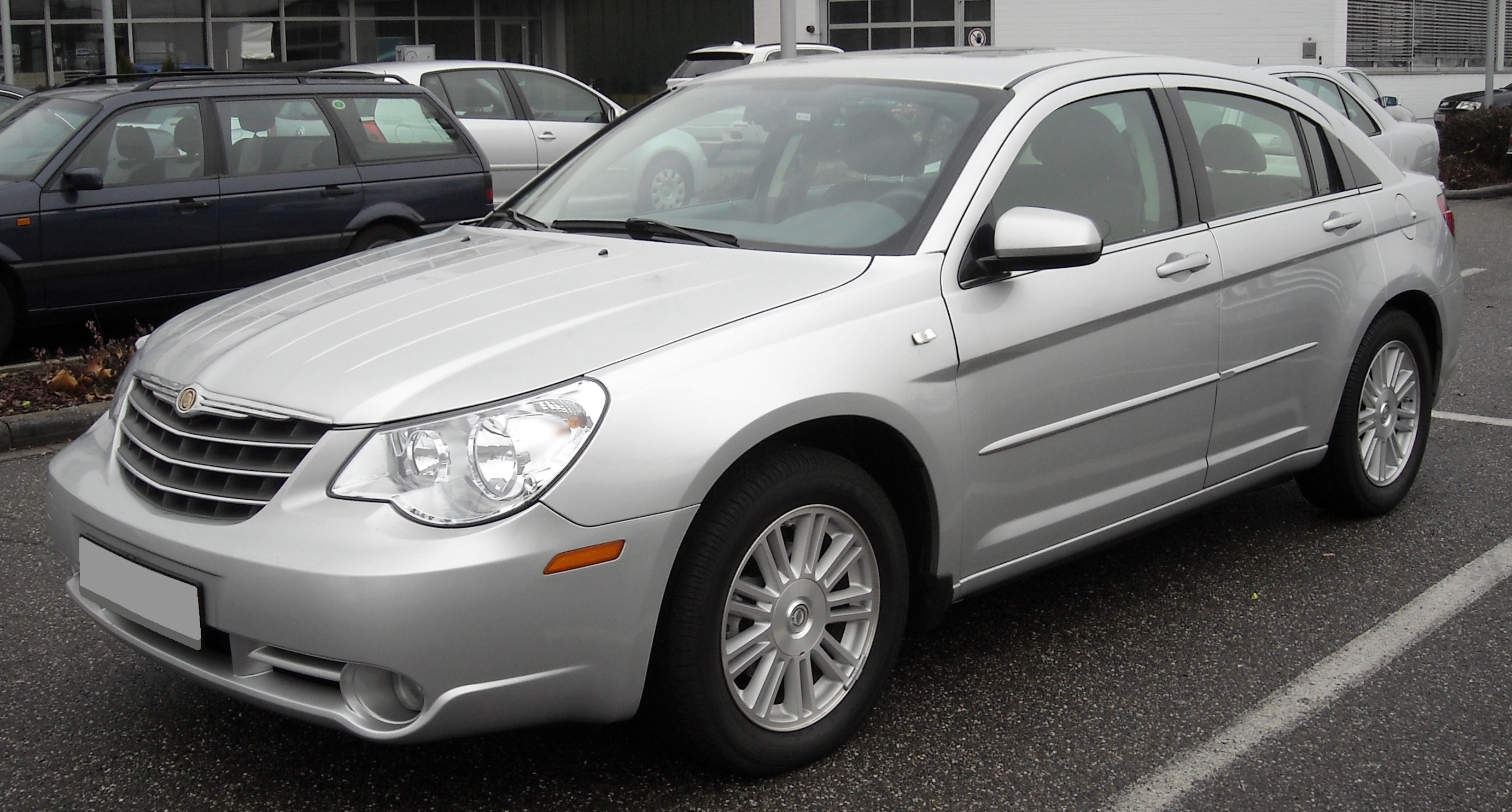
Chrysler Sebring sedan

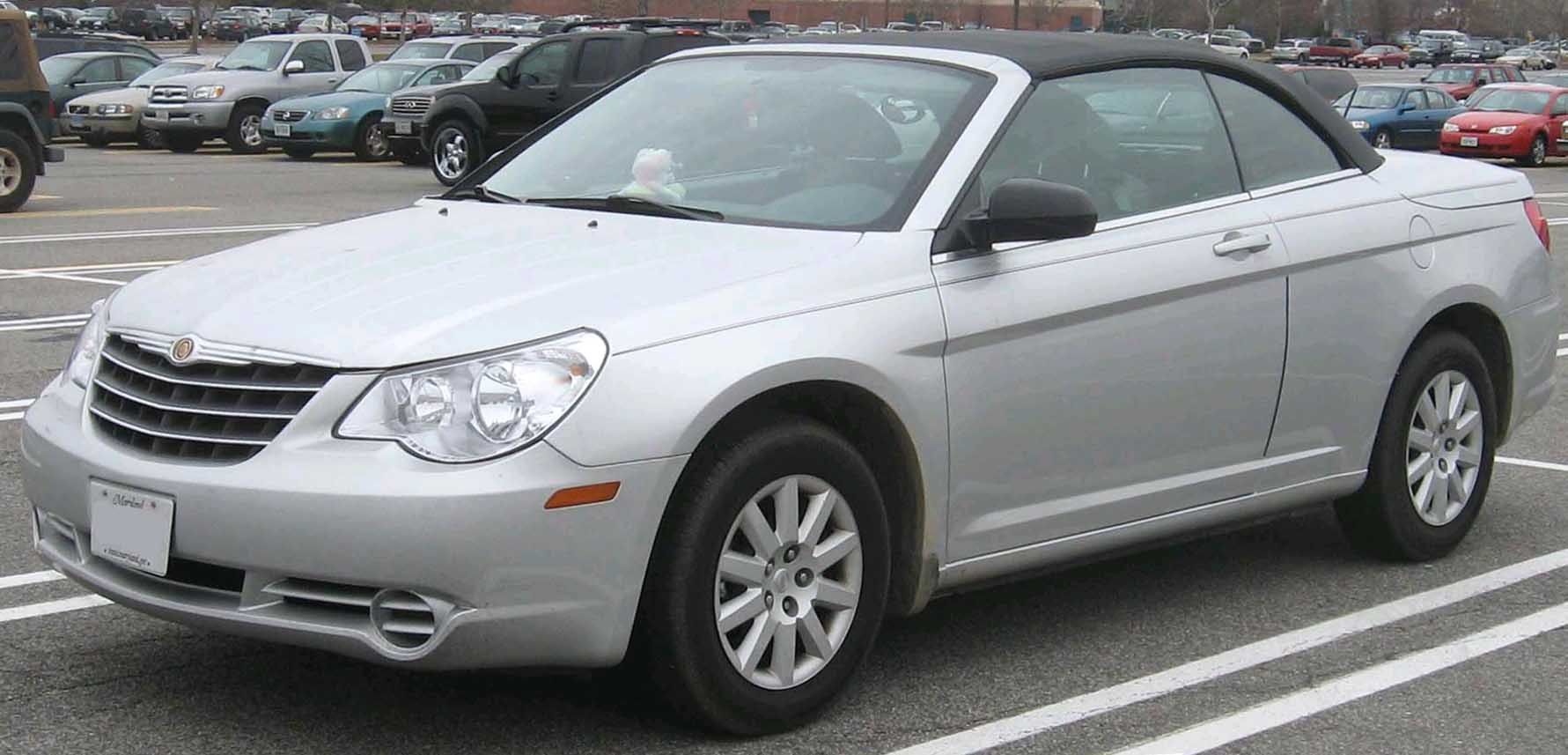
Chrysler Sebring Convertible

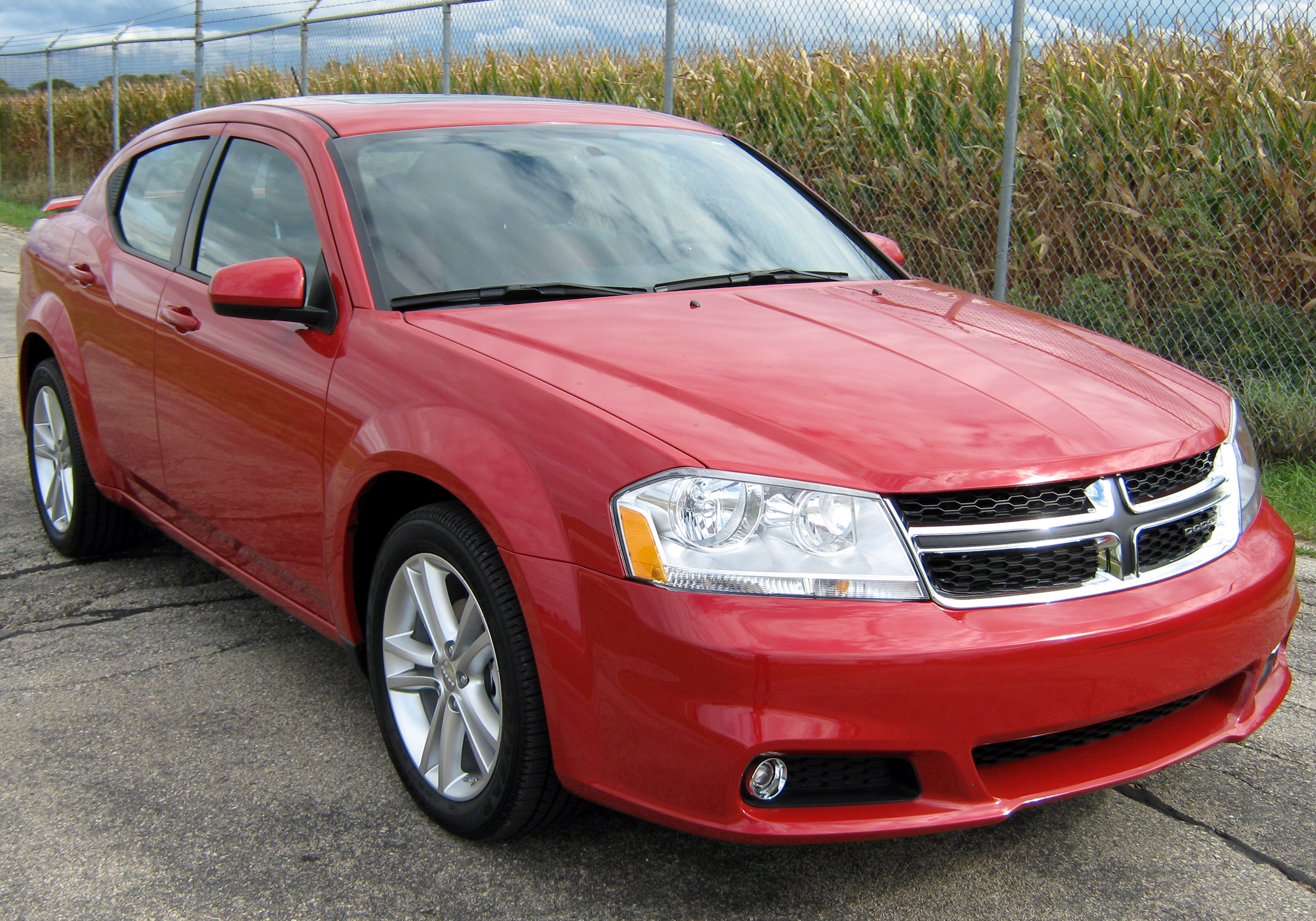
Dodge Avenger

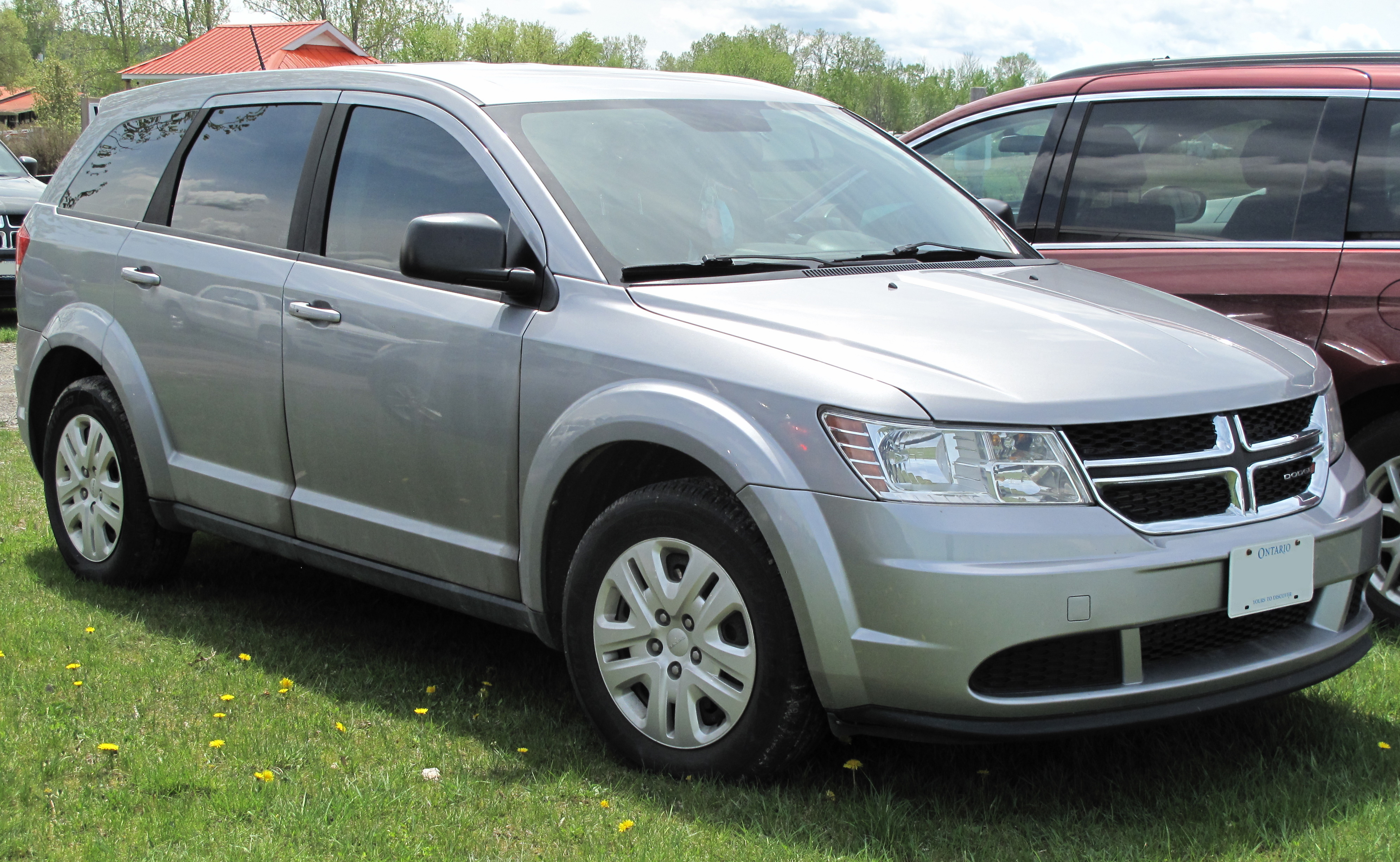
Dodge Journey

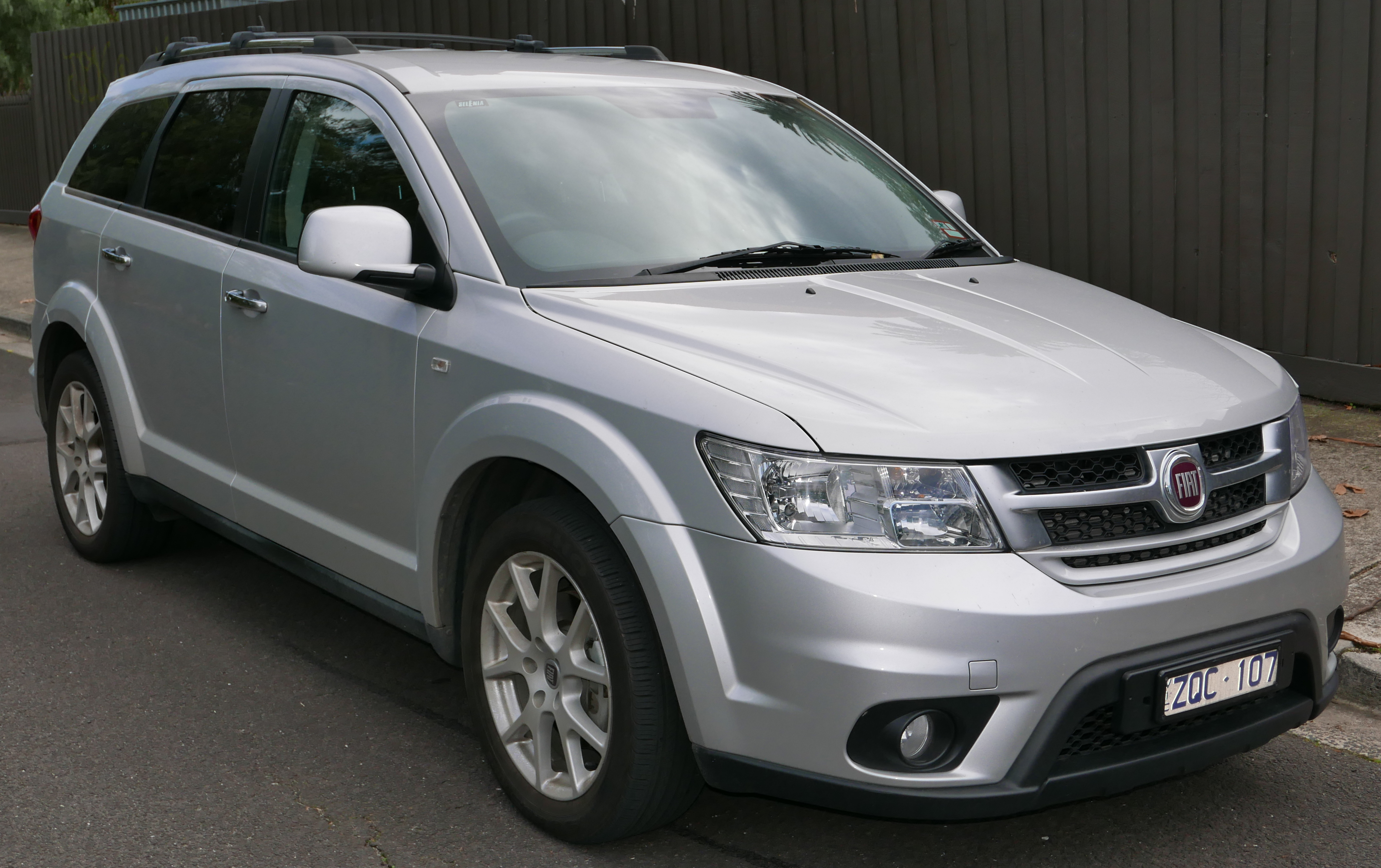
Fiat Freemont

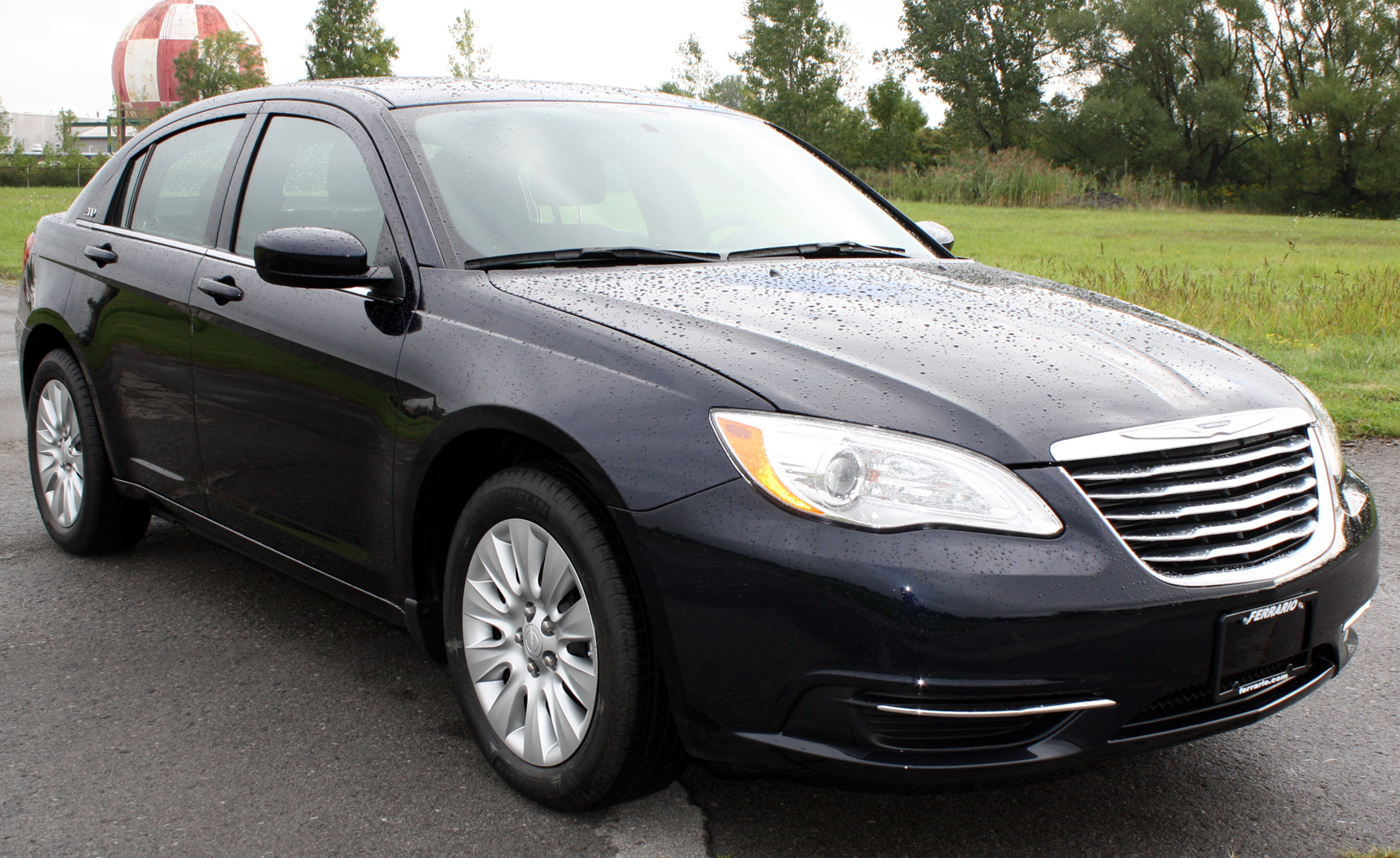
Chrysler 200

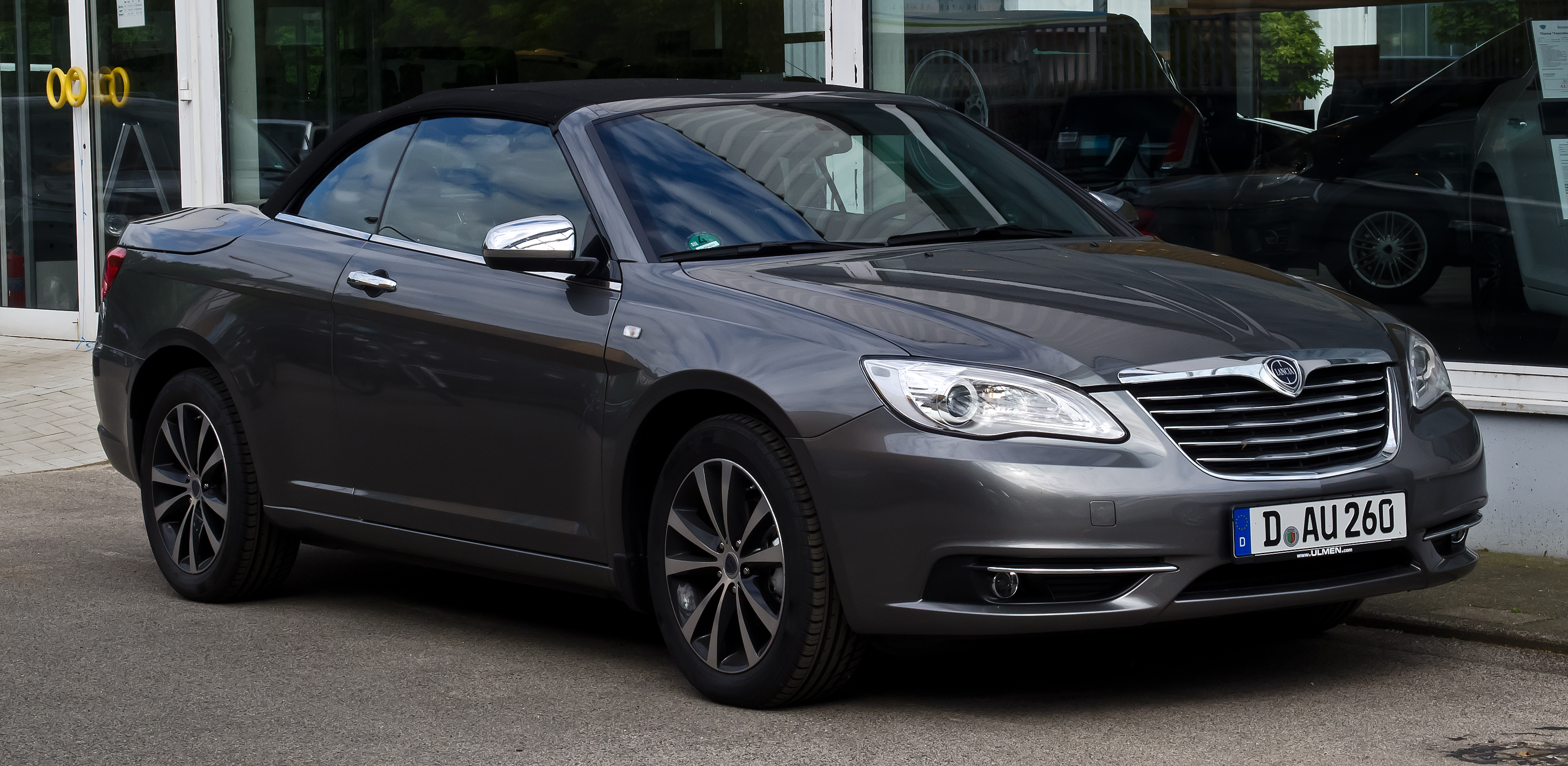
Lancia Flavia

=== Citroën/Peugeot ===
- 2007–2012 Citroën C-Crosser/Peugeot 4007
- 2012–2017 Citroën C4 Aircross/Peugeot 4008
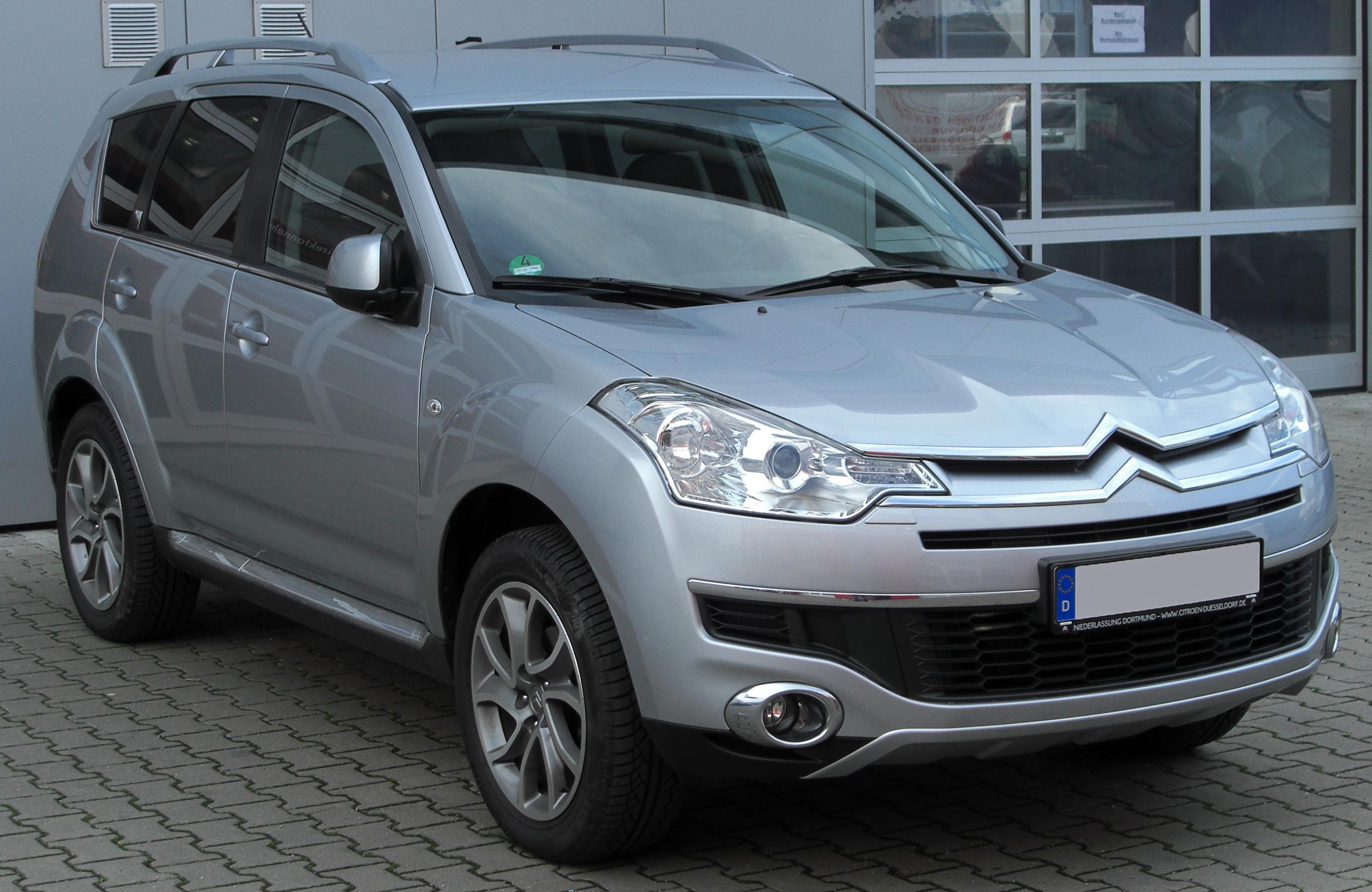
Citroën C-Crosser

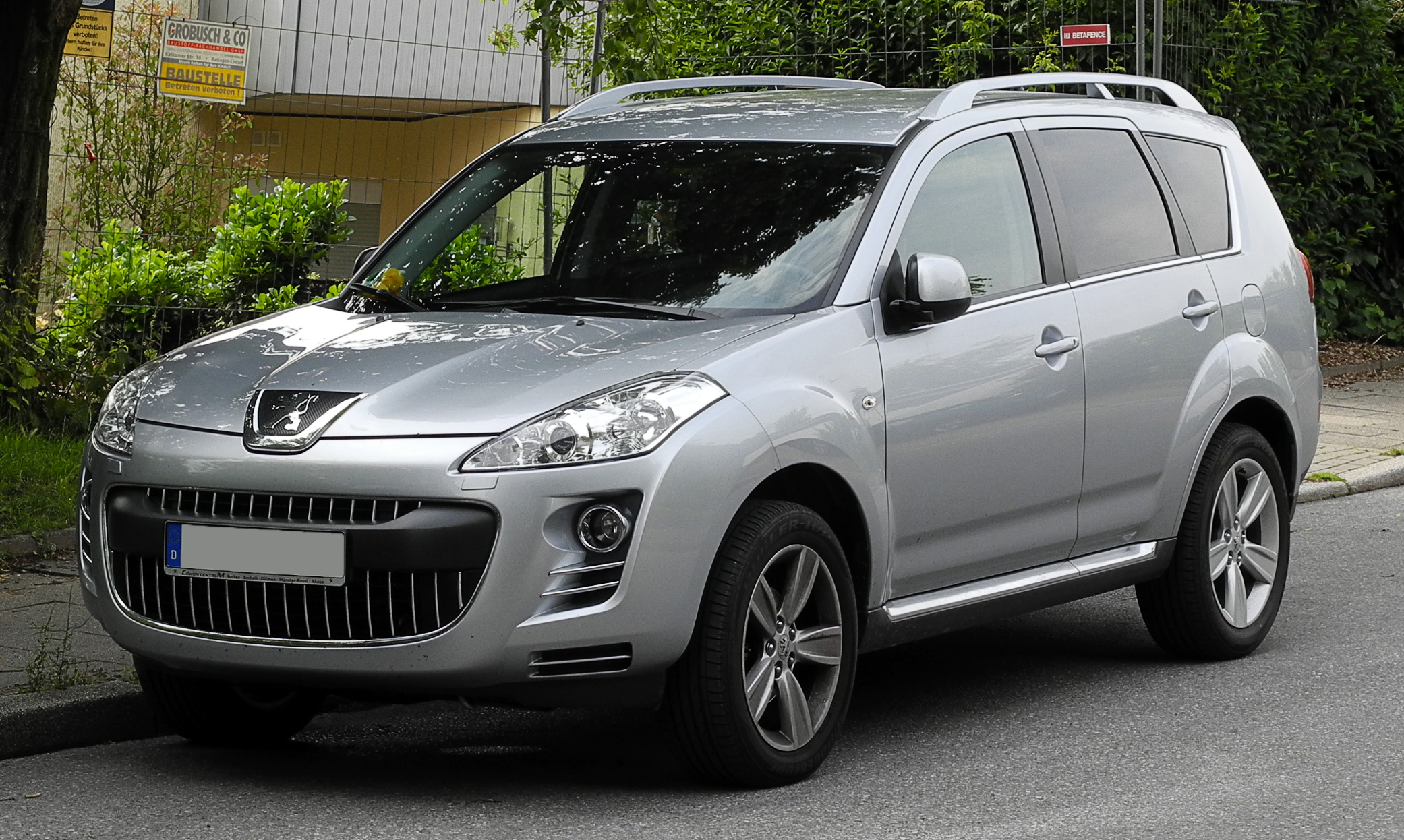
Peugeot 4007

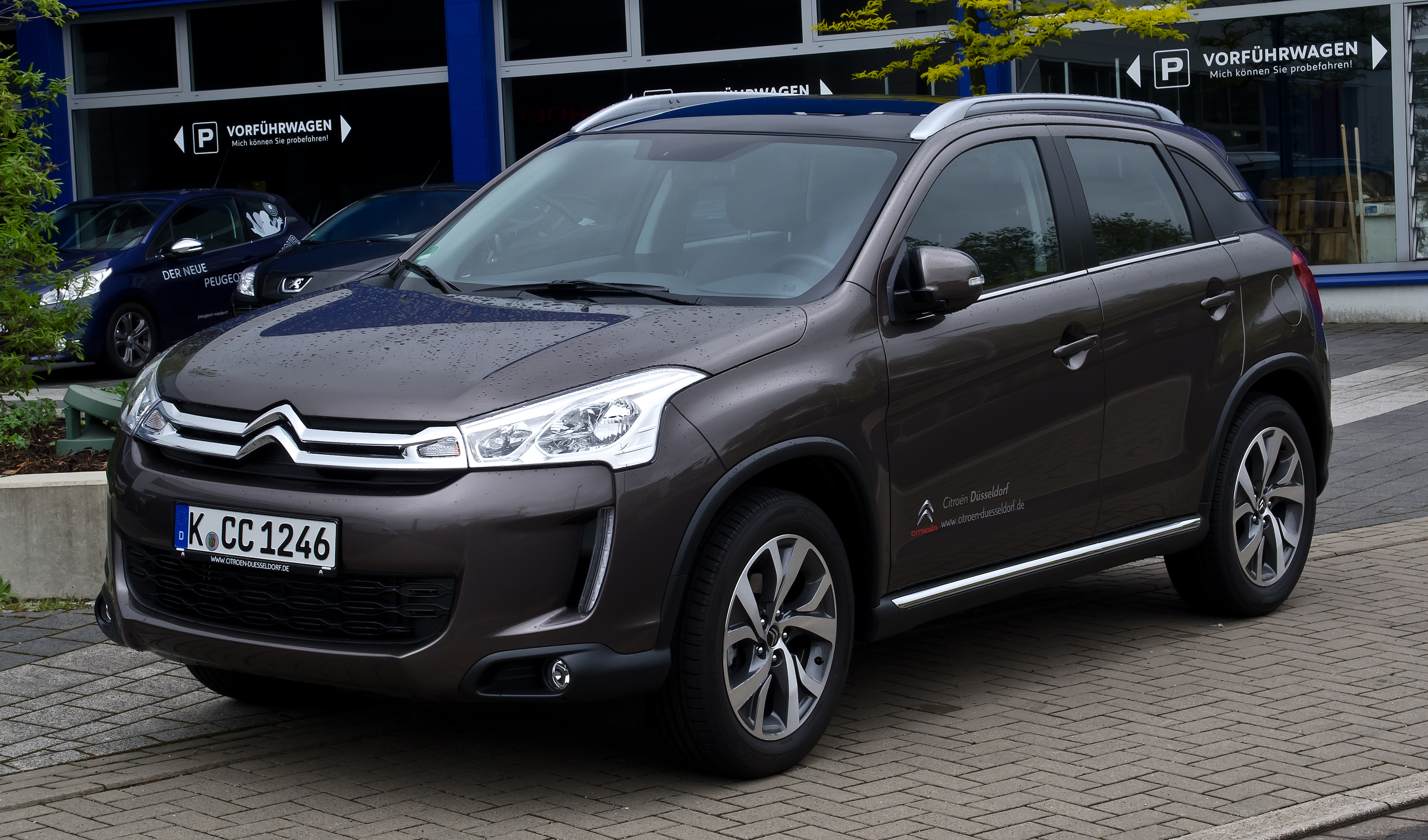
Citroën C4 Aircross

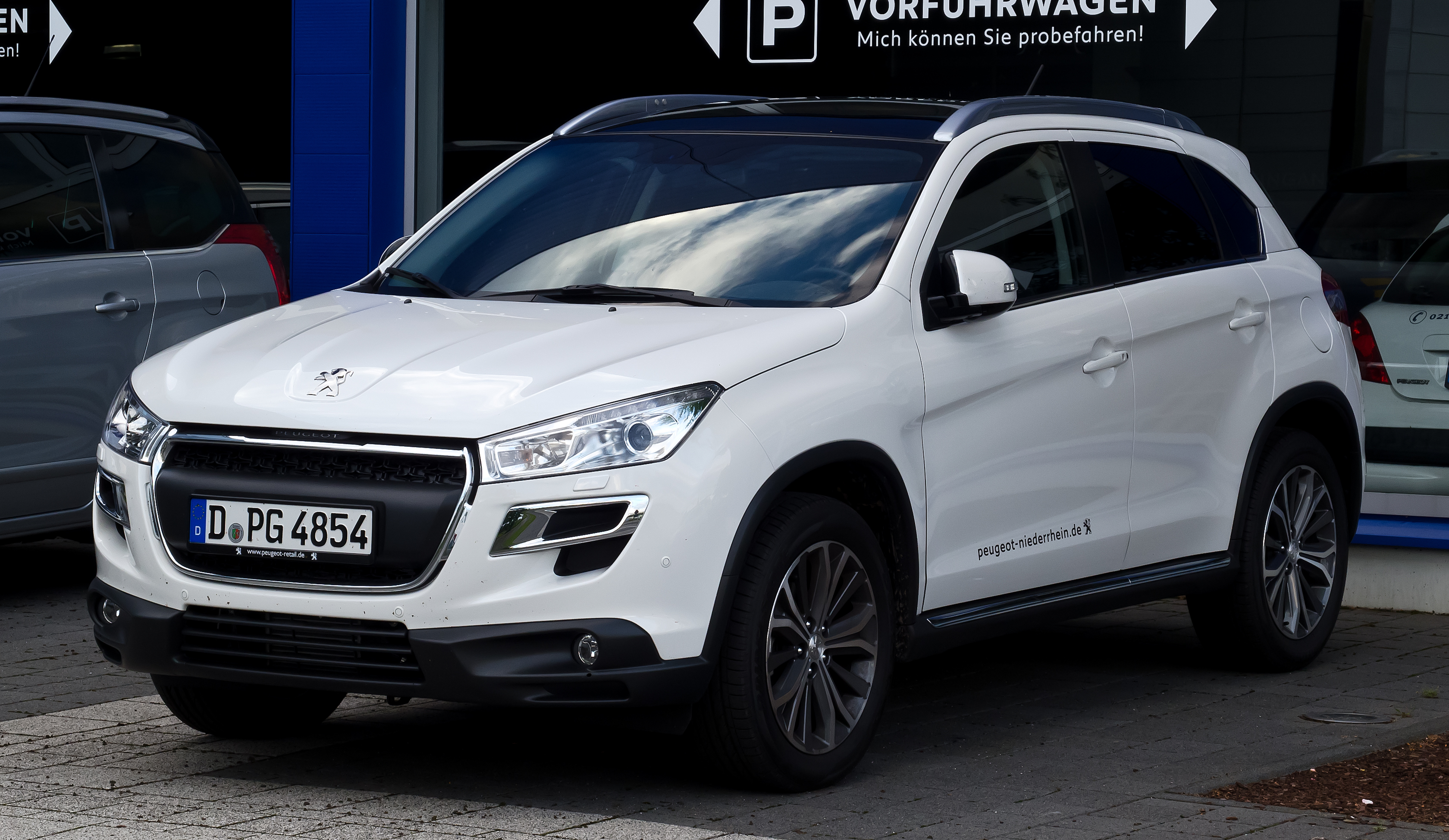
Peugeot 4008

=== Proton ===
- 2010–2015 Proton Inspira
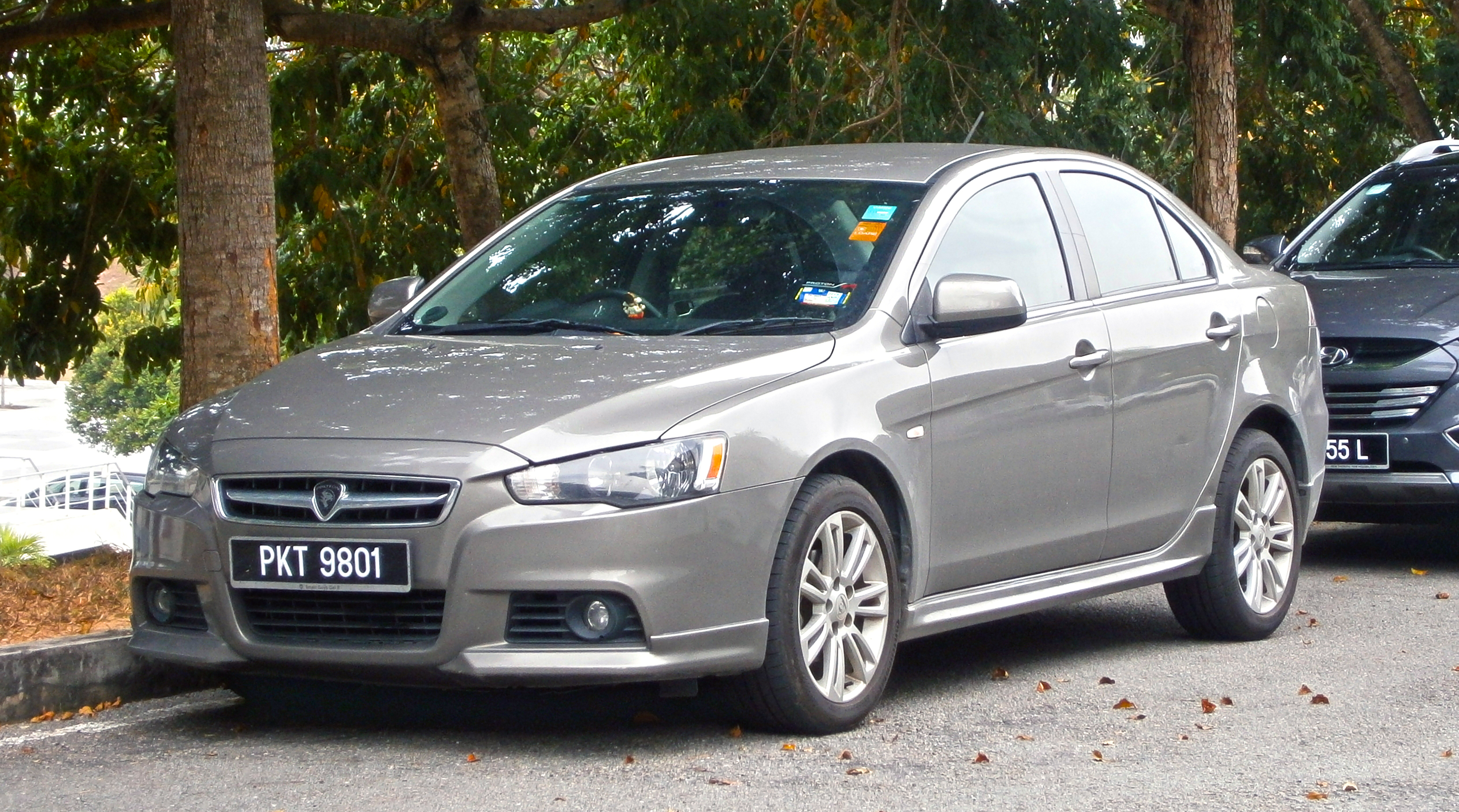
Proton Inspira
