= Citroën C4 Aircross =

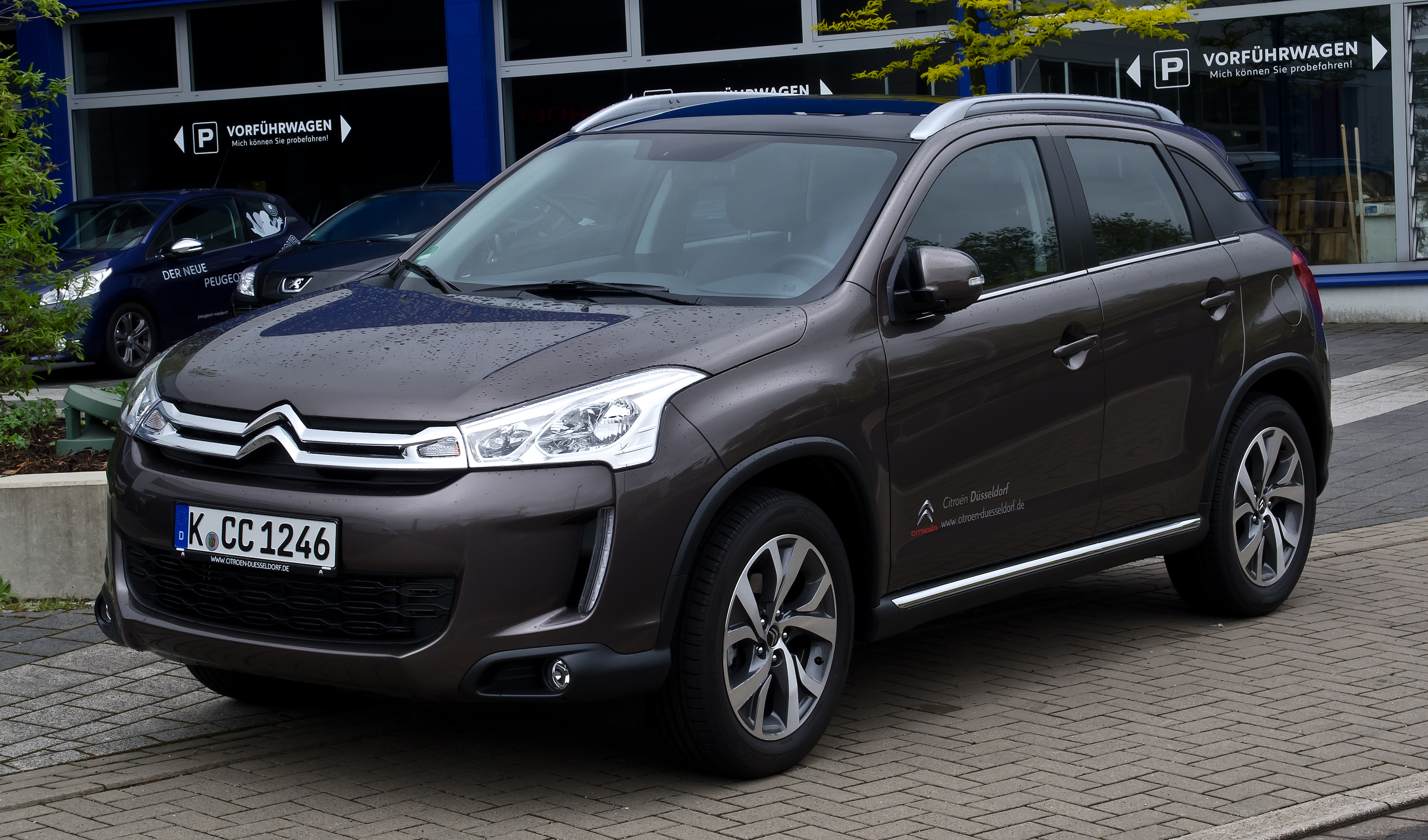

Overview
- Manufacturer: Mitsubishi Motors
- Also called: Mitsubishi RVR/ASX/Outlander Sport; Peugeot 4008
- Production: 2012–2017
- Assembly: Japan: Okazaki (Mitsubishi Motors Nagoya Plant)

Body and chassis
- Class: Compact crossover SUV (C)
- Body style: 5-door SUV
- Layout: Front-engine, front-wheel-drive or all-wheel-drive
- Platform: Mitsubishi GS platform
- Related: Mitsubishi Lancer

Powertrain
- Engine: Petrol: 1.6 L 4A92 I4; 2.0 L 4B11 I4; Diesel: 1.6 L PSA DV6C HDi I4; 1.8 L 4N13 DI-D I4
- Transmission: 5-speed Manual; 6-speed manual; 6-speed automatic; 6-speed INVECS-III CVT

Dimensions
- Wheelbase: 2,670 mm (105.1 in)
- Length: 4,345 mm (171.1 in)
- Width: 1,770 mm (69.7 in)
- Height: 1,615 mm (63.6 in)
- Kerb weight: 1,480 kg (3,260 lb)

Chronology
- Predecessor: Citroen C-Crosser
- Successor: Citroën C4 Cactus; Citroën C5 Aircross; Citroën C4 (2020)

The Citroën C4 Aircross is a compact crossover SUV. It was unveiled at the 2012 Geneva Motor Show.

In October 2011, it was confirmed that the C4 Aircross would not be sold in the United Kingdom or Ireland, due to the Peugeot 3008 already being sold in those countries.

As of January 2017, the C4 Aircross was sold in Algeria, Argentina, Australia, Austria, Belgium, Burkina Faso, China, France, Germany, Italy, Lebanon, Luxembourg, Mongolia, Morocco, New Zealand, Norway, Portugal, Romania, Russia, Slovakia, South Africa, Spain, Switzerland, Tunisia, Ukraine, and Baltic countries.

The related Peugeot 4008 was sold in the European countries listed above, but in fewer countries globally and not in right-hand drive format for the UK and Ireland.

== Trim levels ==
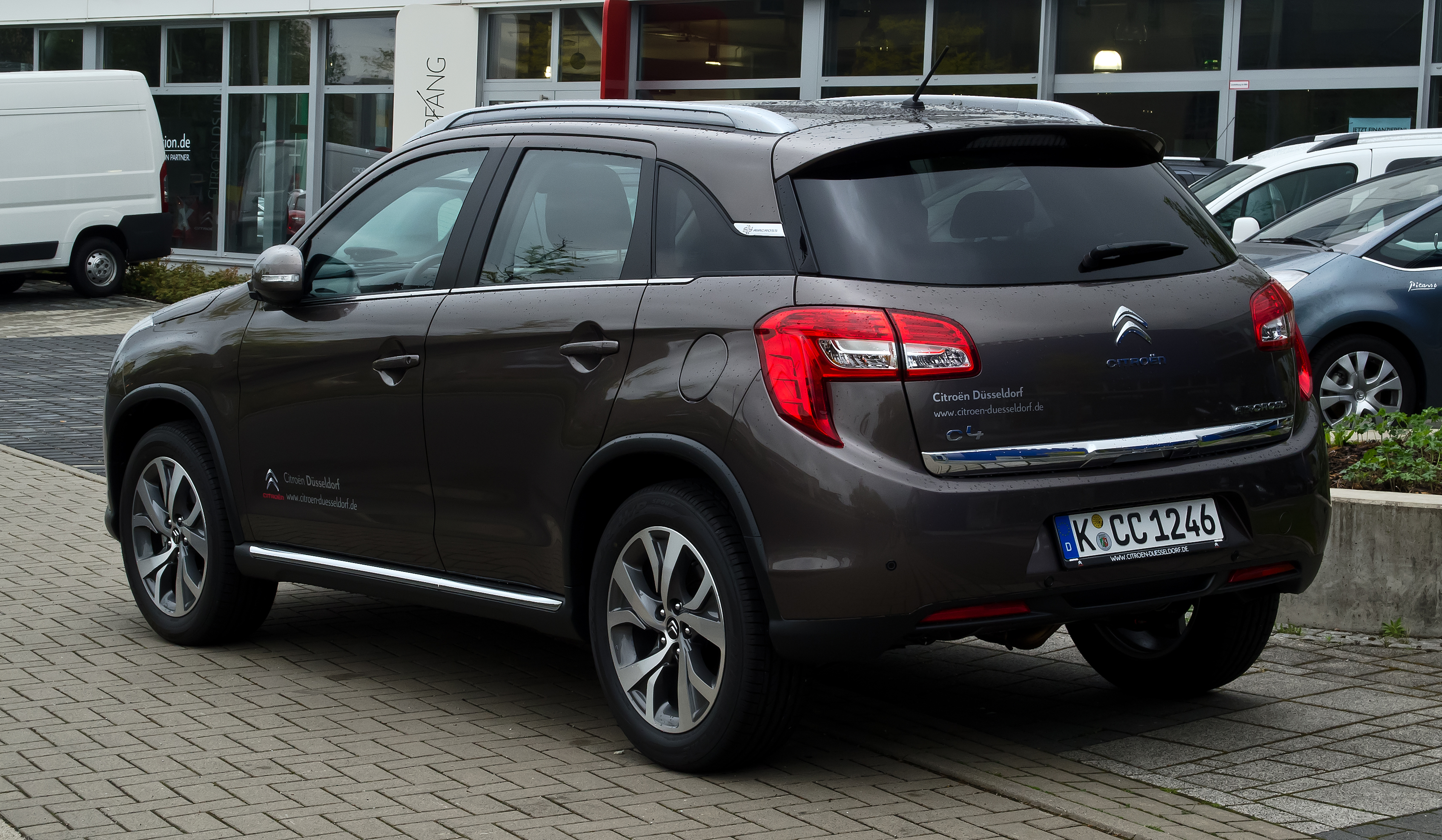
C4 Aircross (rear view)

The C4 Aircross was available in three trim levels: Attraction, Comfort and Exclusive. The Attraction models offered, among other features, seven-series airbags, manual air conditioning, MP3/CD radio and electric mirrors. The Comfort trim featured cruise control, automatic climate control, fog lights and alloy wheels, while the Exclusive trim provided rear-view camera assist, GPS, electric and heated front seats and 18-inch alloy wheels.

Models sold from 1 June 2012 to 31 December 2013 were recalled in June 2017 owing to a suspected fault in the vehicles’ tailgate gas springs. Models sold from 1 June 2012 to 29 November 2013 were recalled in September 2017 owing to concerns that the windscreen wiper motors could fill with water and seize. The entry level was the C4 Aircross 1.6i in the Attraction finish. The diesel version started with the HDi 115 Attraction, while the high-end C4 Aircross was available with the HDi 150 Exclusive finish.

== Powertrain ==
Model	Trans.	Engine type	Displacement	Power	Torque	0–100 km/h (0–62 mph)	Top speed	Drive
Petrol models
1.6i	5-speed manual	1.6 L 4A92 I4	1,590 cc (97.0 cu in; 1.6 L)	117 hp (86 kW) at 6000	154 N⋅m (114 lb⋅ft) at 4000	11.3 s	184 km/h (114 mph)	FWD
2.0i	5-speed manual/CVT	2.0 L 4B11 I4	1,998 cc (121.9 cu in; 2.0 L)	154 hp (113 kW) at 6000	199 N⋅m (147 lb⋅ft) at 4200	9.3 s	200 km/h (120 mph)	FWD; AWD
Diesel models
1.6 HDi	6-speed manual	1.6 L DV6C I4 turbo	1,560 cc (95.2 cu in; 1.6 L)	114 hp (84 kW) at 3600	270 N⋅m (199 lb⋅ft) at 1750-2500	10.3 s	182 km/h (113 mph)	FWD; AWD
1.8 HDi	6-speed manual	1.8 L 4N13 I4 turbo	1,798 cc (109.7 cu in; 1.8 L)	150 hp (110 kW) at 4000	300 N⋅m (221 lb⋅ft) at 2000-3000	10.8 s	200 km/h (120 mph)	FWD; AWD

== Successor ==
Production of the C4 Aircross ceased in April 2017 when it was replaced by the Citroën C5 Aircross, which was unveiled at the Shanghai 2017 China Fair, and then presented in Frankfurt, Germany, as well as the Geneva Motor Show of March 2018, before being officially marketed in November 2018.

== Other uses of the name ==
In China, the name C4 Aircross was given to a long-wheelbase version of the C3 Aircross from December 2018 to December 2020.

== Sales and production ==
Year	Worldwide production	Worldwide sales	Notes
2012	21,700	17,000	Total production reaches 21,900 units.
2013	11,800	13,600	
