= Peugeot 4008 =

Compact crossover SUV

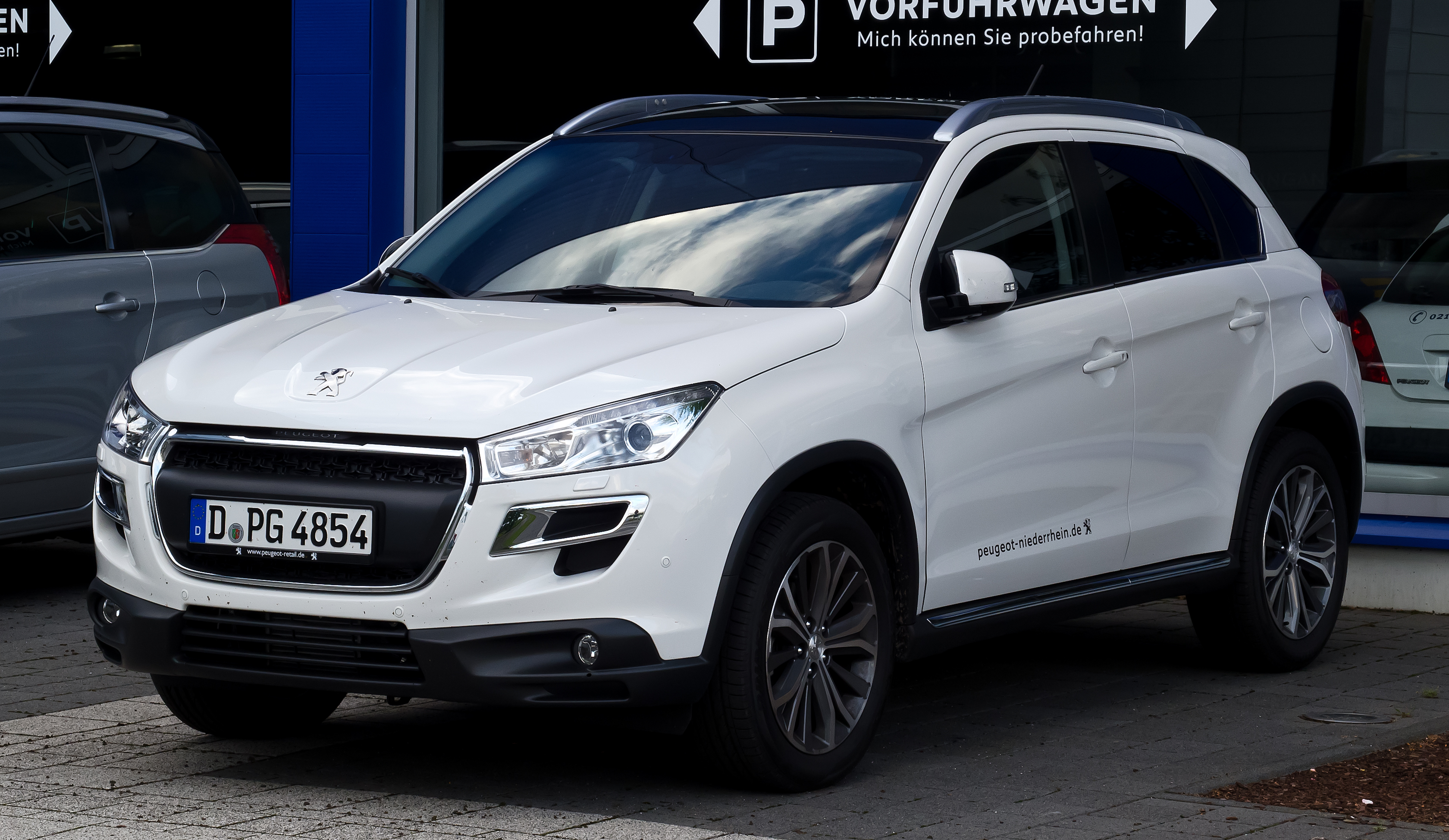

Overview
- Manufacturer: Mitsubishi Motors
- Also called: Mitsubishi RVR/ASX/Outlander Sport; Citroën C4 Aircross
- Production: 2012–2017
- Assembly: Japan: Okazaki, Aichi (Mitsubishi Motors Okazaki Plant)
- Designer: Cristian Gudima

Body and chassis
- Class: Compact crossover SUV (C)
- Body style: 5-door SUV
- Layout: Front-engine, front-wheel-drive Front-engine, four-wheel-drive
- Platform: Mitsubishi GS Platform

Powertrain
- Engine: 1.6–2.0 L I4 (petrol); 1.6 L HDi I4 (diesel); 1.8 L DI-D I4 (diesel)
- Transmission: 6-speed manual 6-speed automatic

Dimensions
- Wheelbase: 2,670 mm (105.1 in)
- Length: 4,340 mm (170.9 in)
- Width: 1,768 mm (69.6 in)
- Height: 1,632 mm (64.3 in)
- Kerb weight: 1,440–1,470 kg (3,175–3,241 lb)

Chronology
- Predecessor: Peugeot 4007
- Successor: Peugeot 2008 II; Peugeot 3008 II

The Peugeot 4008 is a compact crossover SUV produced by Mitsubishi Motors under the French marque Peugeot.

It was based on the same platform as the Mitsubishi ASX and the Citroën C4 Aircross, and was developed in collaboration with the Japanese manufacturer Mitsubishi Motors. It débuted at the 2012 Geneva Motor Show, along with the smaller 208. Sales commenced in April that year. The car was replaced by the second-generation 3008 in 2017.

As of January 2017, the 4008 was sold in France, Luxembourg, China, Algeria, Burkina Faso, Slovakia, Russia, Ukraine, Mongolia, Romania, Bulgaria, Germany, South Africa, Austria, Switzerland, Belgium, Spain, Norway, countries of the Baltic, Lebanon, Morocco, Tunisia, Chile, Argentina, New Zealand and Australia. Its twin, the C4 Aircross, was being sold in more countries globally, including European countries not listed above, but not in either the UK or Ireland in right-hand drive versions.

== Recalls ==
Models sold from 2 April 2012 to 31 December 2015 were recalled in June 2017, owing to suspected faults with the vehicles’ tailgate gas springs. Models sold from 1 June 2012 to 29 November 2013 were recalled in September 2017, owing to concerns that the windscreen wiper motors could fill with water and seize.

== Gallery ==
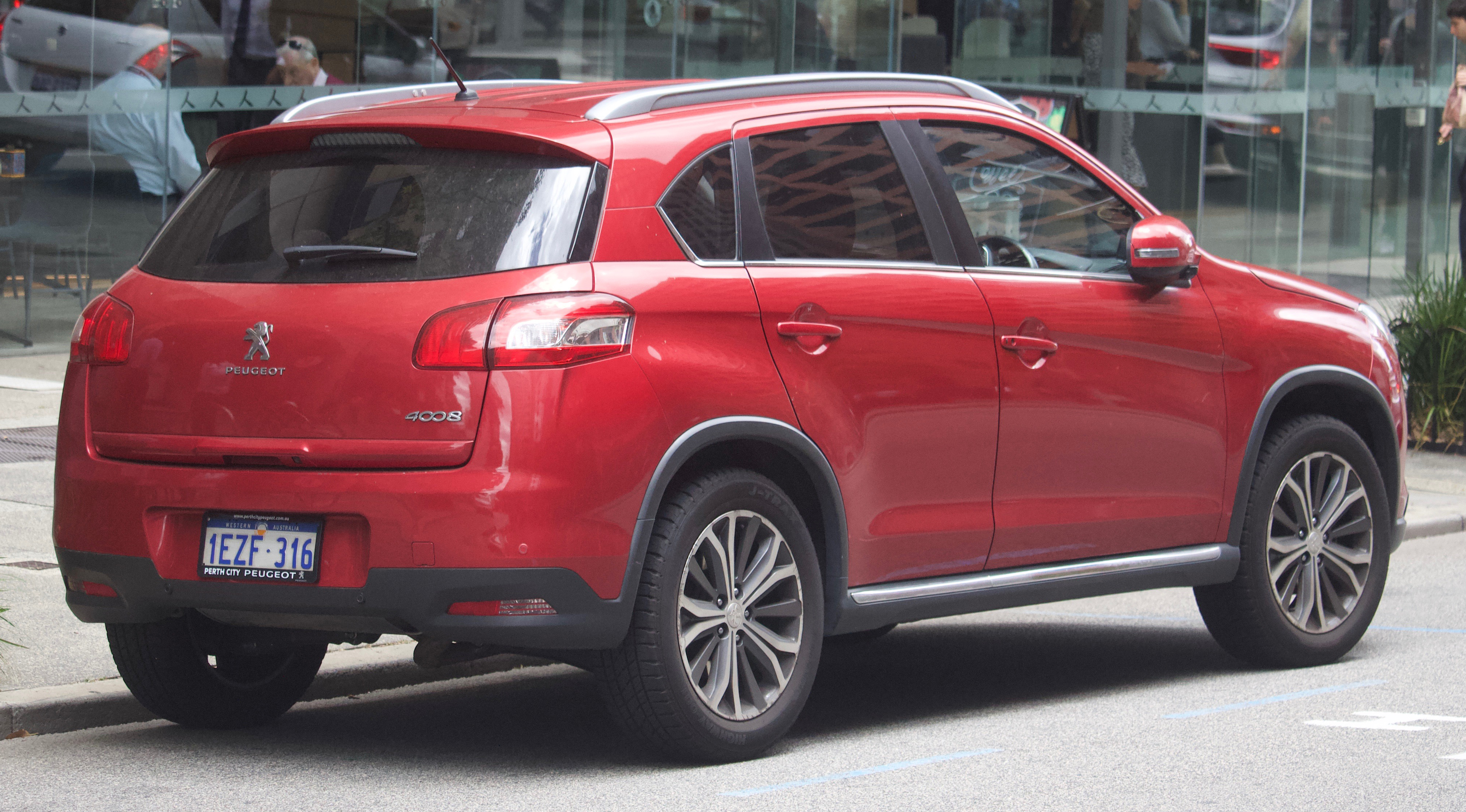
2016 Peugeot 4008
