= Peugeot 4007 =

Compact crossover SUV

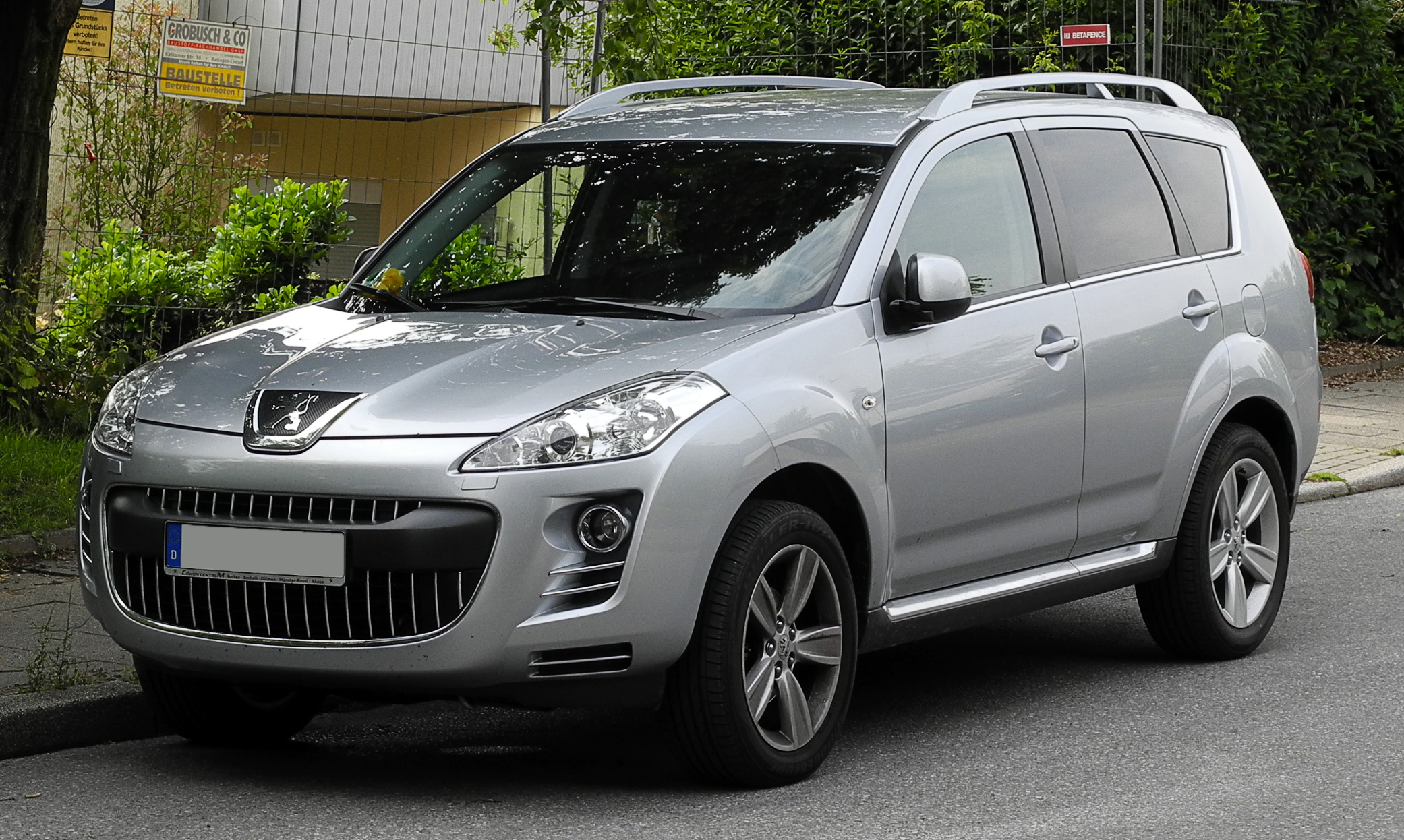

Overview
- Manufacturer: Mitsubishi Motors
- Also called: Mitsubishi Outlander (second generation); Citroën C-Crosser
- Production: July 2007 – April 2012 (49,000 Examples)
- Assembly: Japan: Okazaki (Mitsubishi Motors Nagoya Plant); Russia: Kaluga (PCMA Rus)
- Designer: Ivo Groen

Body and chassis
- Class: Compact crossover SUV (C)
- Body style: 5-door SUV
- Layout: Front-engine, front-wheel-drive Front-engine, four-wheel-drive
- Platform: Mitsubishi GS platform

Powertrain
- Engine: Petrol: 2.0 L Mitsubishi 4B11 I4; 2.4 L Mitsubishi 4B12 I4; Diesel: 2.2 L DW12 turbo I4
- Transmission: 6-speed manual 6-speed dual-clutch

Chronology
- Successor: Peugeot 4008; Peugeot 3008

The Peugeot 4007 is a compact crossover SUV produced by Mitsubishi Motors for the French automobile marque Peugeot, between July 2007 and April 2012. The equivalent Citroën badge-engineered version was the C-Crosser. Both were produced in Mitsubishi's Nagoya Plant in Okazaki, Japan, based on the second-generation Outlander. It was shown at the Geneva Motor Show in March 2007.

Together, the 4007 and C-Crosser were the first Japan-produced cars sold under any French brand. They had their sales target of 30,000 units per year. It was officially launched on 12 July 2007. The standard 4007 comes with a Holland & Holland 4007 show car.

Both vehicles had been planned to be assembled in the Nedcar plant in Born, Netherlands for the European market, however, the plan was postponed indefinitely as sales of the two models fell below the target of 30,000 units.

== Engines ==
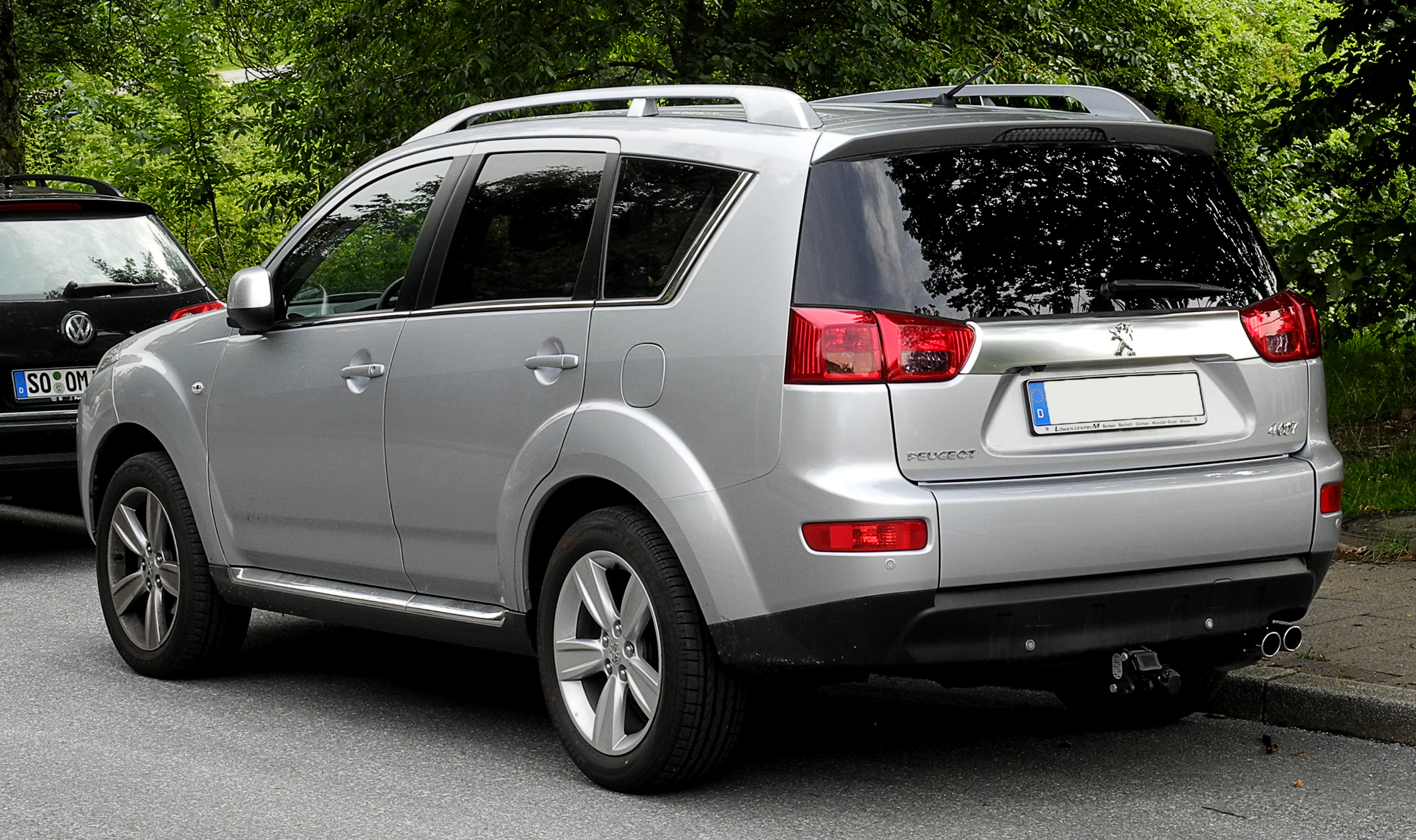
Peugeot 4007

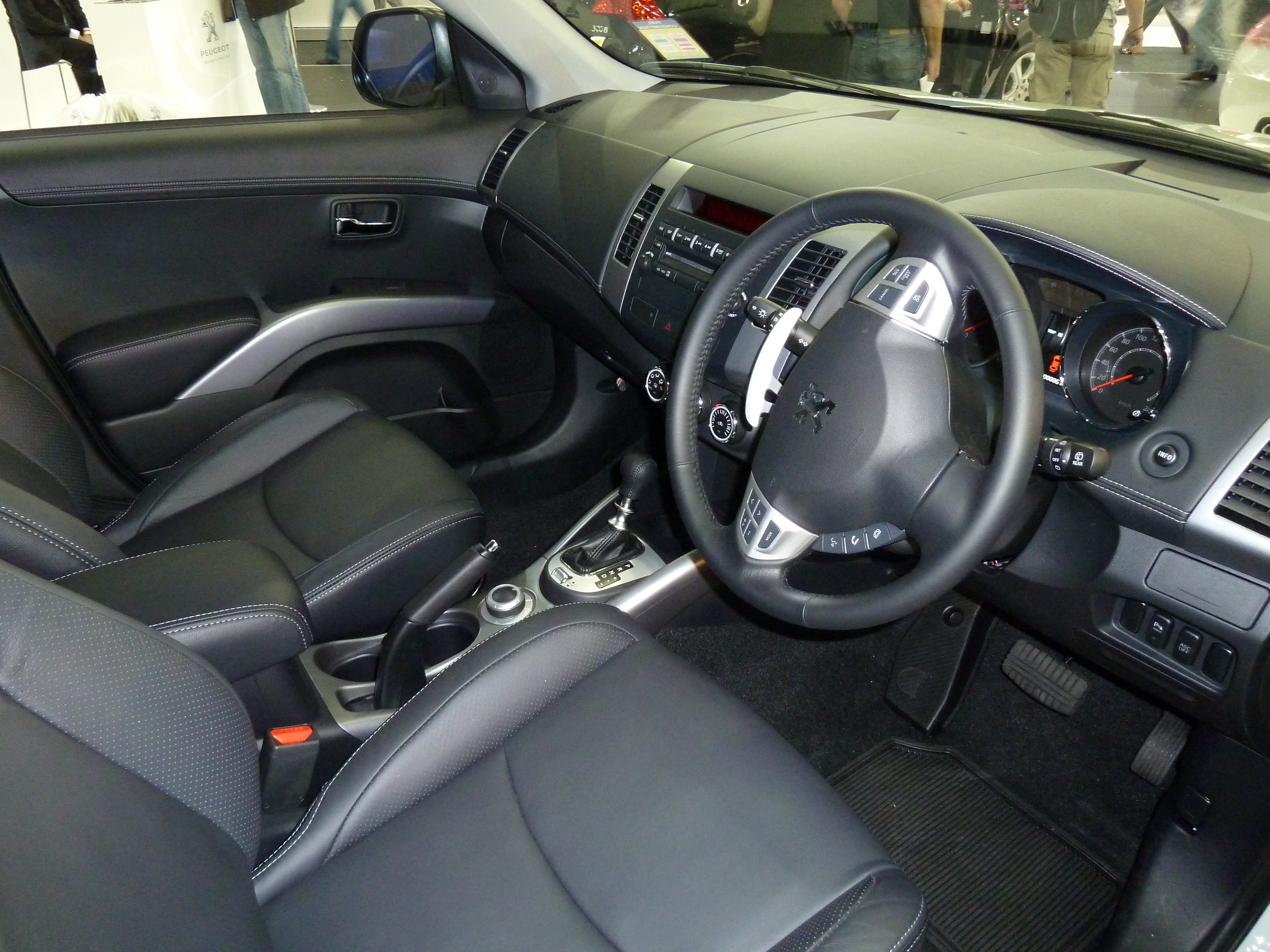
Interior

- 2.2 L (2179 cc) DW12 HDi turbodiesel straight-4, 115 kW (156 PS), 380 N⋅m (280 lbf⋅ft); with a particulate filter and a six speed gearbox, and able to run on 30% biodiesel
- 2.0 L (1998 cc) 4B11 Petrol DOHC 16 valve I4, 147 PS (same engine as the Outlander) — for Russian market only
- 2.4 L 4B12 Petrol DOHC 16 valve MIVEC I4, 170 PS (same engine as the Outlander)

== Models ==
There were three available trim levels for the Peugeot 4007, all featuring a 2.2 Hdi engine:

- SE — The standard model, with alloy wheels, climate control, heated mirrors, power steering etc.
- Sport XS — SE trim, plus leather seats and a telephone
- GT — SE trim, plus headlamp washers, CD multichanger, heated leather seats, telephone, etc.

== Sales and production ==
Year	Worldwide Production	Worldwide sales	Notes
2007	TBA	6,300	
2008	TBA	13,700	
2009	4,500	9,400	
2010	9,000	8,400	
2011	6,957	7,387	Total production reaches 46,658 units.
2012	2,300	2,700	Total production reaches 49,000 units.
