= Citroën C-Crosser =

Compact crossover SUV produced by Citroën (2007-2012)

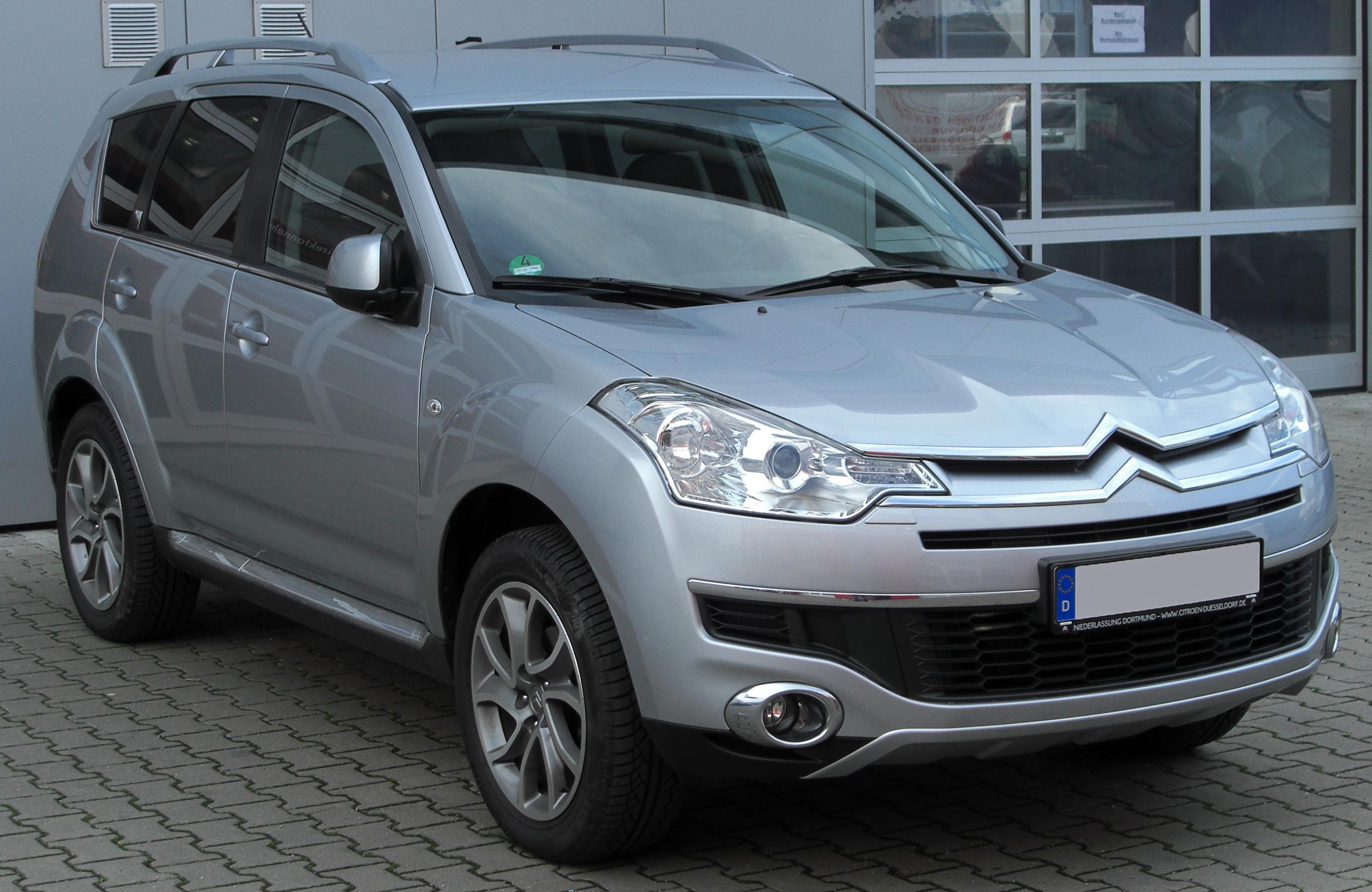

Overview
- Manufacturer: Mitsubishi Motors
- Also called: Mitsubishi Outlander (second generation); Peugeot 4007
- Production: 2007–2012 (47,800 units produced)
- Assembly: Japan: Okazaki (Mitsubishi Motors Nagoya Plant); Russia: Kaluga (PCMA Rus)
- Designer: Domagoj Đukec

Body and chassis
- Class: Compact crossover SUV (C)
- Body style: 5-door SUV
- Layout: Front-engine, front-wheel-drive Front-engine, four-wheel-drive
- Platform: Mitsubishi GS platform

Powertrain
- Engine: 2.4 L Mitsubishi 4B12 I4 (petrol); 2.2 L DW12 turbo I4 (diesel)
- Transmission: 6-speed manual 6-speed dual-clutch

Dimensions
- Wheelbase: 2,670 mm (105.1 in)
- Length: 4,645 mm (182.9 in)
- Width: 1,805 mm (71.1 in)
- Height: 1,715 mm (67.5 in)
- Kerb weight: 1,750 kg (3,858 lb)

Chronology
- Predecessor: Citroën Méhari; Citroën FAF
- Successor: Citroën C4 Aircross

The Citroën C-Crosser is a compact crossover SUV launched in July 2007, designed for the French manufacturer Citroën, and produced by Mitsubishi on the basis of the Outlander. The equivalent Peugeot badge engineered version was the 4007.

It was expected that the car would be named the C7, but in October 2006, it was announced that it would be called the C-Crosser. The C-Crosser took its name from the four-wheel drive concept car that Citroën first displayed in the 2001 Frankfurt Motor Show. The C-Crosser was shown at the Geneva Motor Show in March 2007.

Together, the 4007 and C-Crosser were the first Japanese produced cars sold under any French brand. They had been planned to be assembled, for Europe, in the factory that was built in the 1960s to assemble DAFs, now Mitsubishi's Nedcar plant in Born, Netherlands, but this was postponed indefinitely, due to slow sales of the models.

From 2011, they were assembled at the Russian PSA Peugeot Citroën/Mitsubishi joint venture factory in Kaluga. In March 2012, production of the C-Crosser ended, and it was replaced by the C4 Aircross. By the end of production, only 2,050 units had been sold.

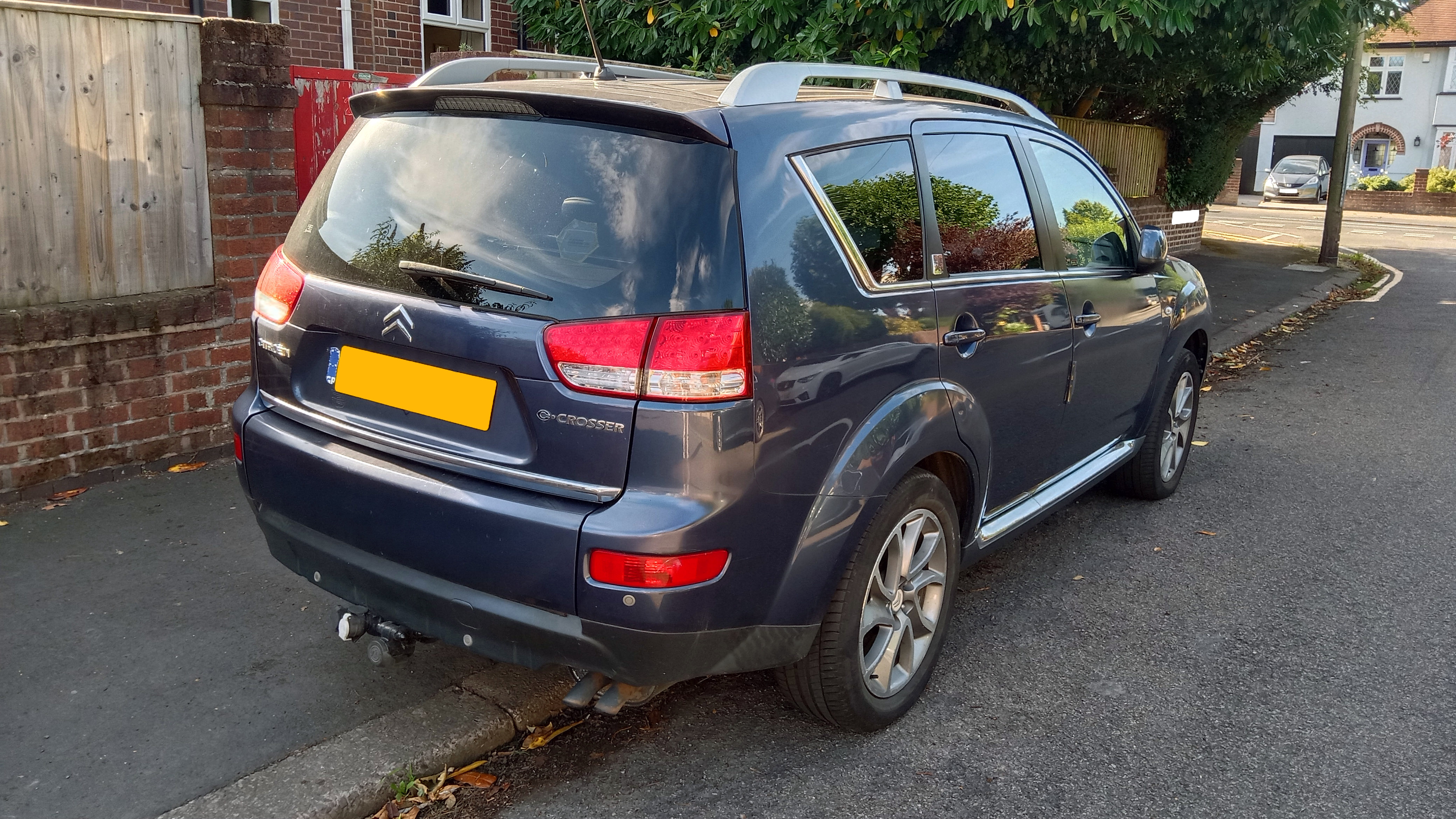
Rear view

== Seating ==
The second and third row of seats can be folded away to provide a flat floor, and an expanded load capacity for the boot. The rear two seats can be completely hidden away under the floor, while the second row of seating slides to offer greater leg room or boot space, features a 60:40 split/fold function that is operated via electric controls in the boot.

This allows for the car to be used for both sporting, and also for transporting groups of up to seven people, including the driver. This is similar to the seating arrangement in the contemporary Citroën C4 Picasso, which also offers the capability of seating seven persons.

== Engines and transmissions ==
- Diesel (PSA)
  - 2.2 L DW12 HDi turbodiesel straight-4, 156 PS (115 kW; 154 hp) and 380 N⋅m (280 lb⋅ft)
- Petrol (not available in all markets)
  - 2.4 L 4B12 DOHC 16 valve MIVEC I4, 170 PS (125 kW; 168 bhp) (same engine as the Outlander)

The C-Crosser's integral transmission allows drivers to have a choice of three settings, dependent on road conditions and driving style: two-wheel drive, four-wheel drive, and a lock setting designed for low grip conditions. Ensuring an optimum blend of comfort, road holding, and off-road capability. All these transmissions are selectable using the control behind the gear lever.

== Commercial model ==
At the 2008 British International Motor Show, Citroën presented a panel van C-Crosser. This light commercial vehicle version comes without rear seats and without side windows. It is called Citroën C-Crosser Commercial and is only intended to be sold in the United Kingdom. It has a two-piece rear tailgate and a load compartment volume of 2.3m3.

== Sales and production ==
Year	Worldwide Production	Worldwide sales	Notes
2009	5,000	9,400	
2010	8,600	8,500	All 2010 production took place at the Okazaki facility.
2011	7,135	7,460	Total production reaches 45,430 units.
2012	2,300	3,300	Total production reaches 47,800 units.
