= Suzuki Indomobil Motor =

Indonesian vehicle manufacturer

PT Suzuki Indomobil Motor
- Company type: Subsidiary
- Industry: Automotive
- Predecessor: PT Indomobil Suzuki International
- Founded: 1978
- Headquarters: Jakarta, Indonesia
- Area served: Indonesia
- Key people: Minoru Amano (President-Director)
- Products: Automobiles; Motorcycles
- Production output: ▲124,658 (2019)
- Owner: Suzuki Motor Corporation (94.94%); PT Indomobil Sukses Internasional Tbk (4.55%); PT Serasi Tunggal Karya (0.51%)
- Subsidiaries: PT Suzuki Indomobil Sales (99%)
- Website: www.suzuki.co.id

PT Suzuki Indomobil Motor (formerly PT Indomobil Suzuki International until December 2008) is a joint venture between Suzuki Motor Corporation and the Indomobil Group. The company is located in Jakarta, Indonesia and specializes in manufacturing Suzuki vehicles for the domestic and international markets. A separate company, PT Suzuki Indomobil Sales (SIS), previously PT Indomobil Niaga International, handles sales and marketing of Suzuki automobiles and motorcycles.

Suzuki's first activities in the Indonesian market in 1970 were through its import firm PT Indohero Steel & Engineering Company. Six years later Suzuki built a manufacturing facility, which is the oldest part of the Indomobil Group.

Suzuki's first product was the ST20 Carry (introduced in 1978), which saw extensive use as an Angkot. Nicknamed "Turungtung" (an onomatopoetic word for the sound made by the Carry's two-stroke engine), it was built until at least 1983.

In 2011, the company invested $800 million to produce the Low Cost Green Car (LCGC) in Indonesia. In 2015, Suzuki opened another plant in Cikarang with a total investment of $1 billion. The plant manufactured the Ertiga MPV for both domestic and export markets and the K10B engine for the Karimun Wagon R.

== Current models ==
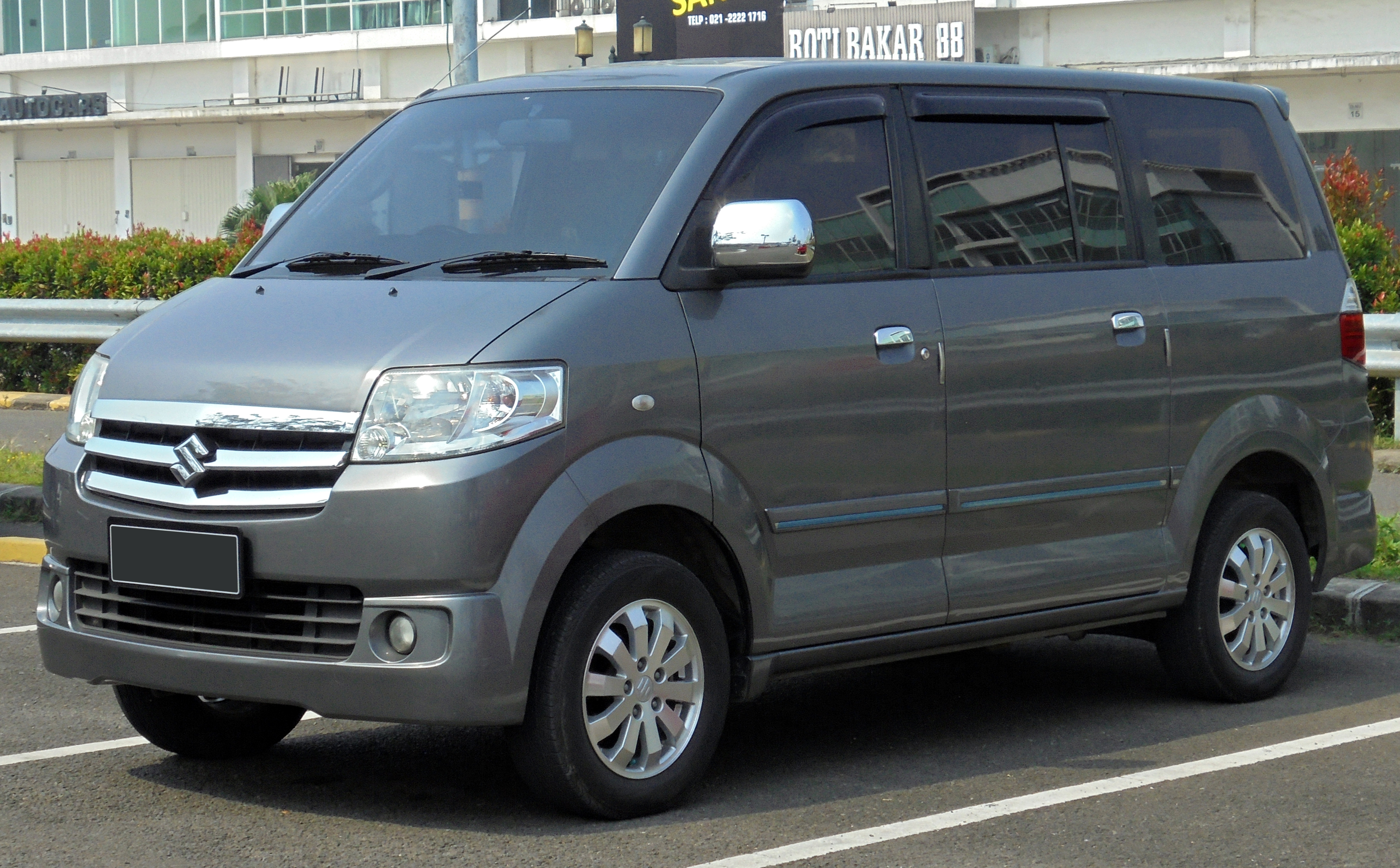
2014 Suzuki APV Arena SGX (DN42V)

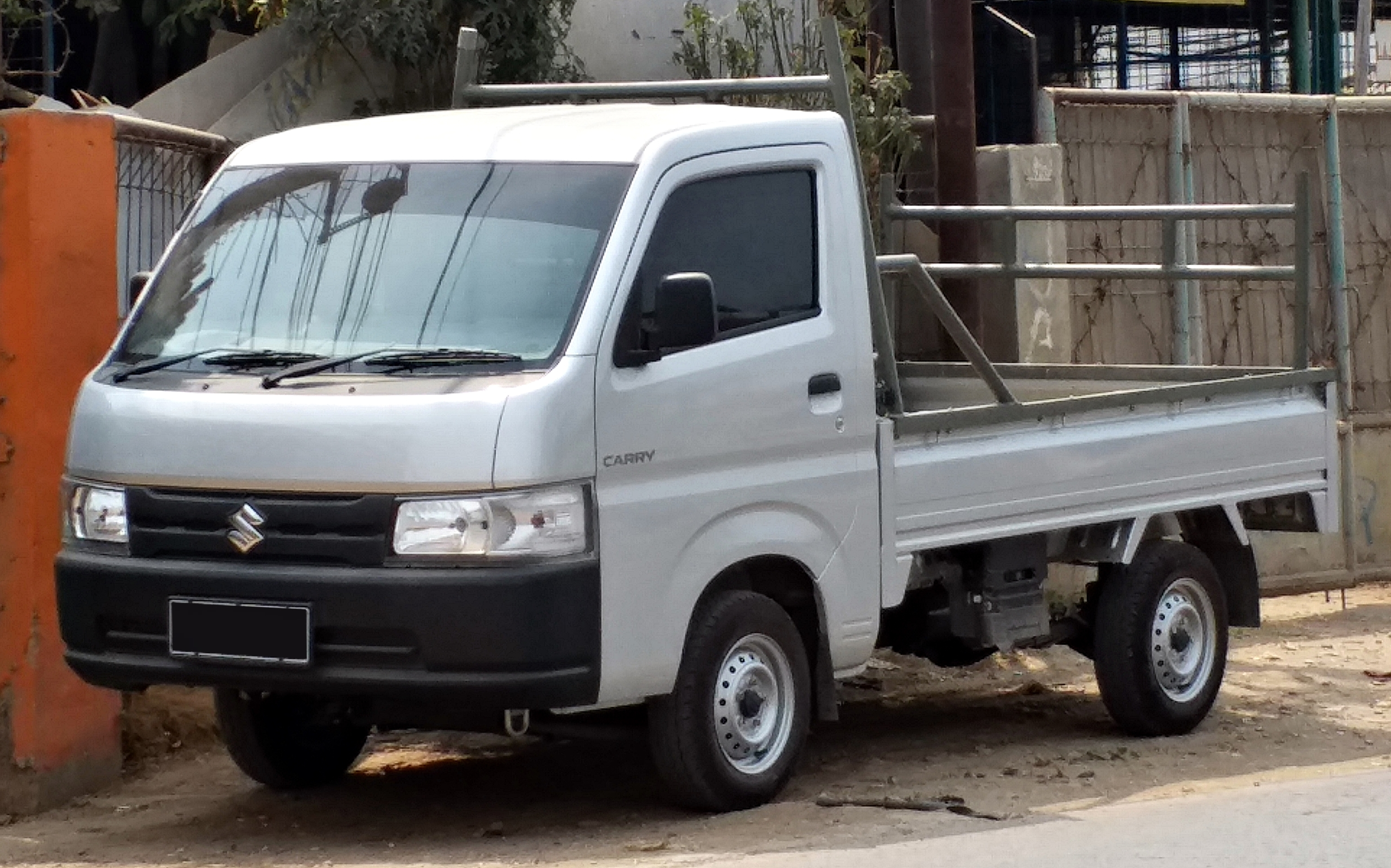
2019 Suzuki Carry Flat Deck (DC61T)

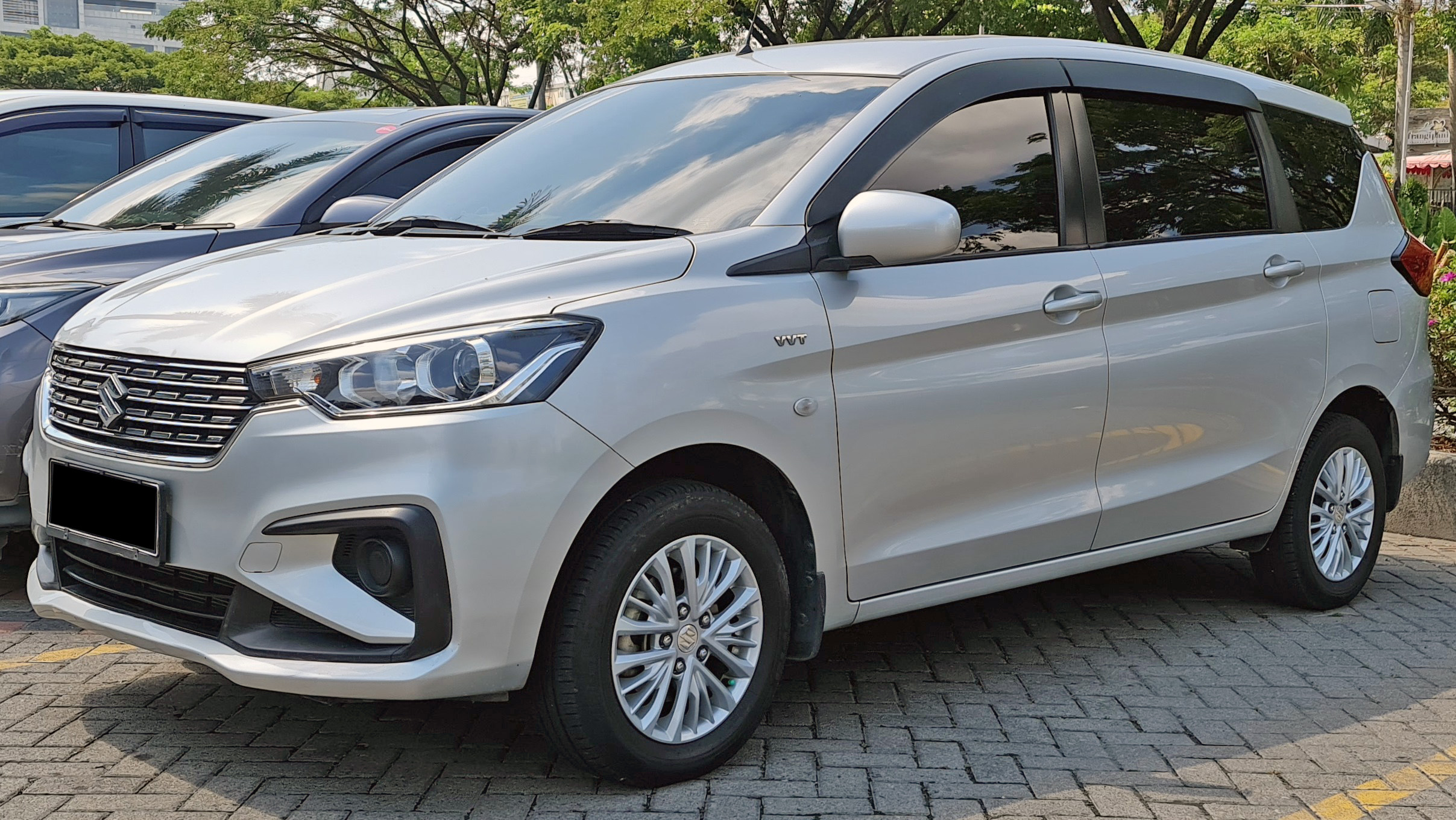
2019 Suzuki Ertiga GL (NC22S)

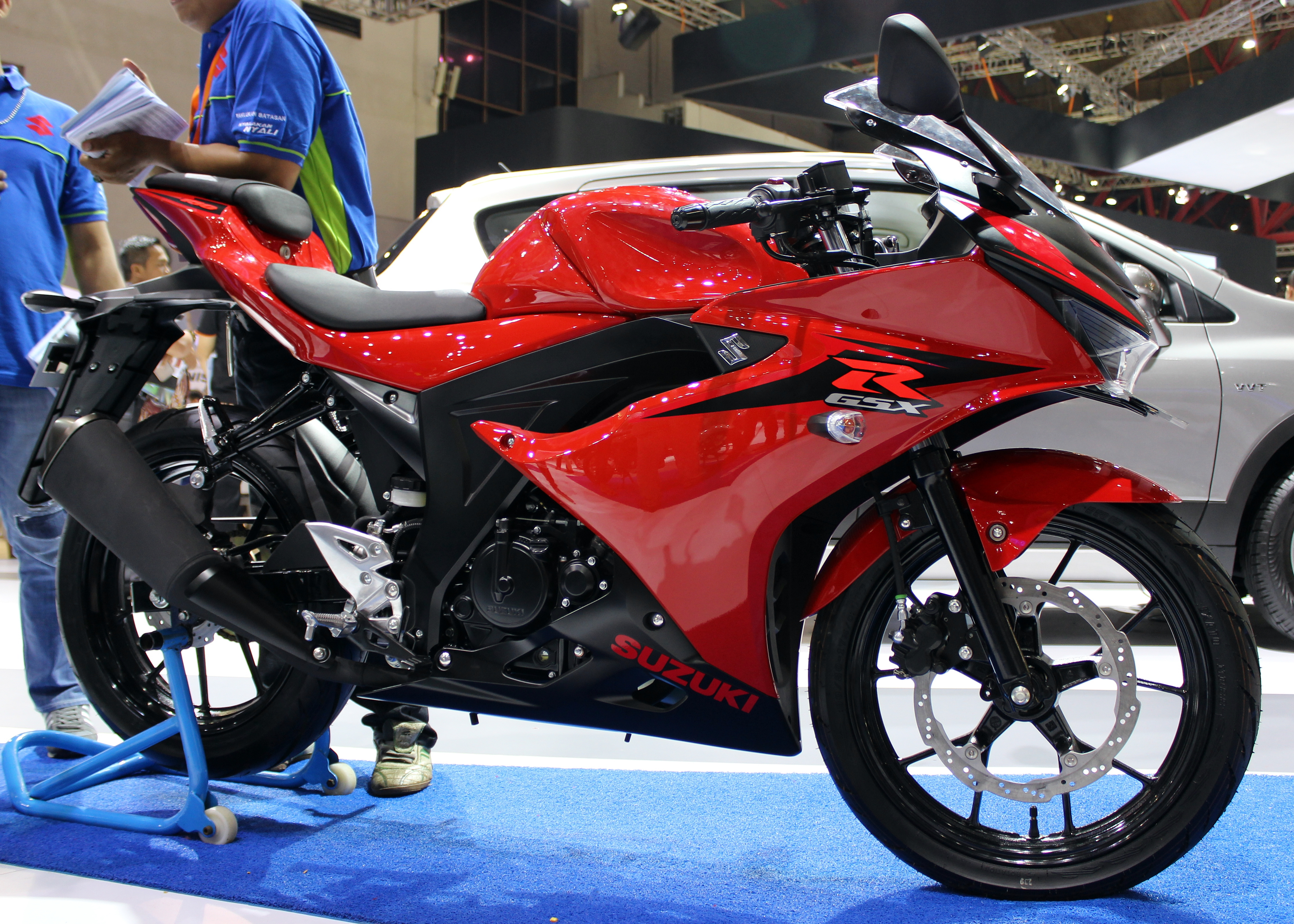
2017 Suzuki GSX-R150

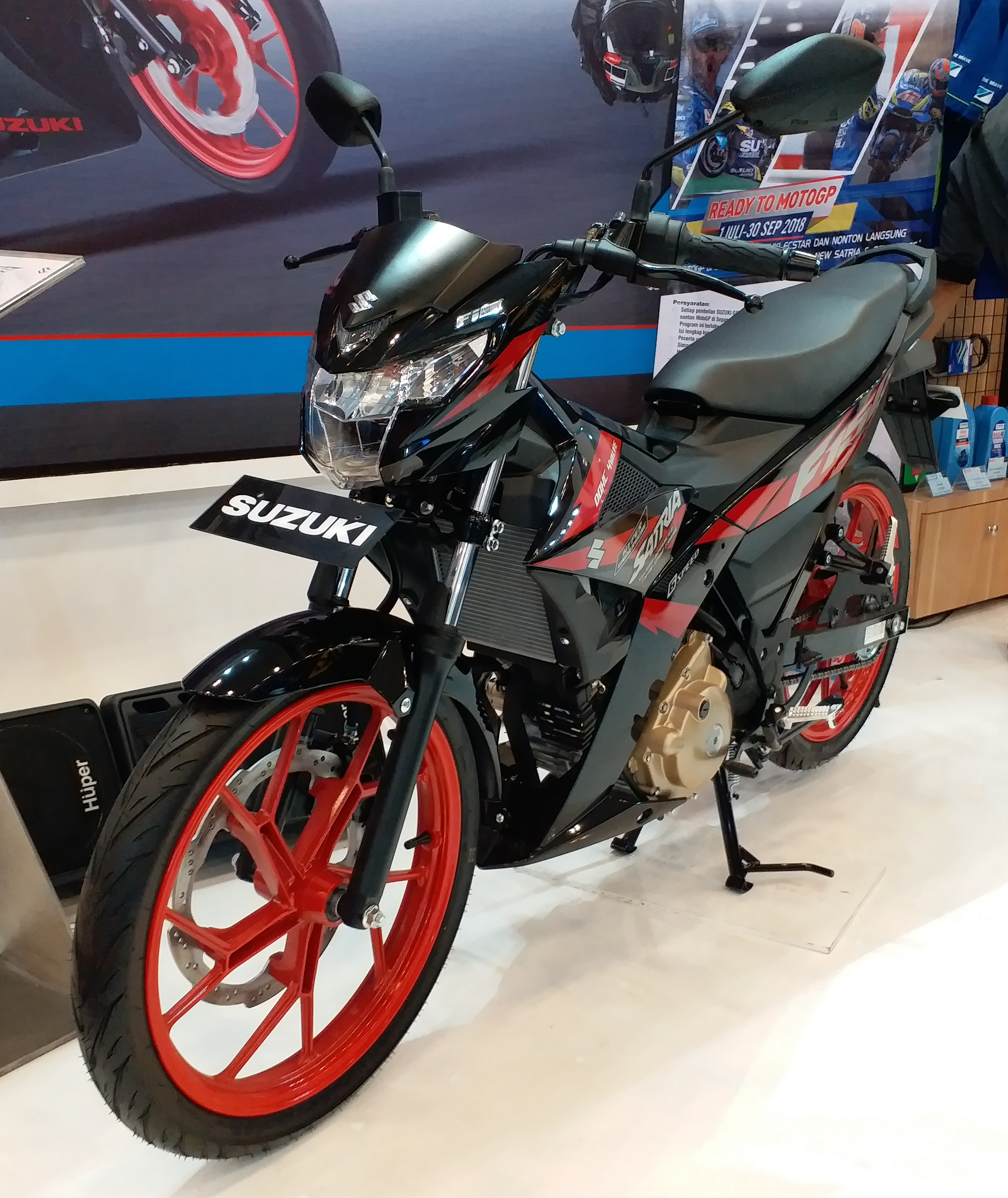
2018 Suzuki Satria F150

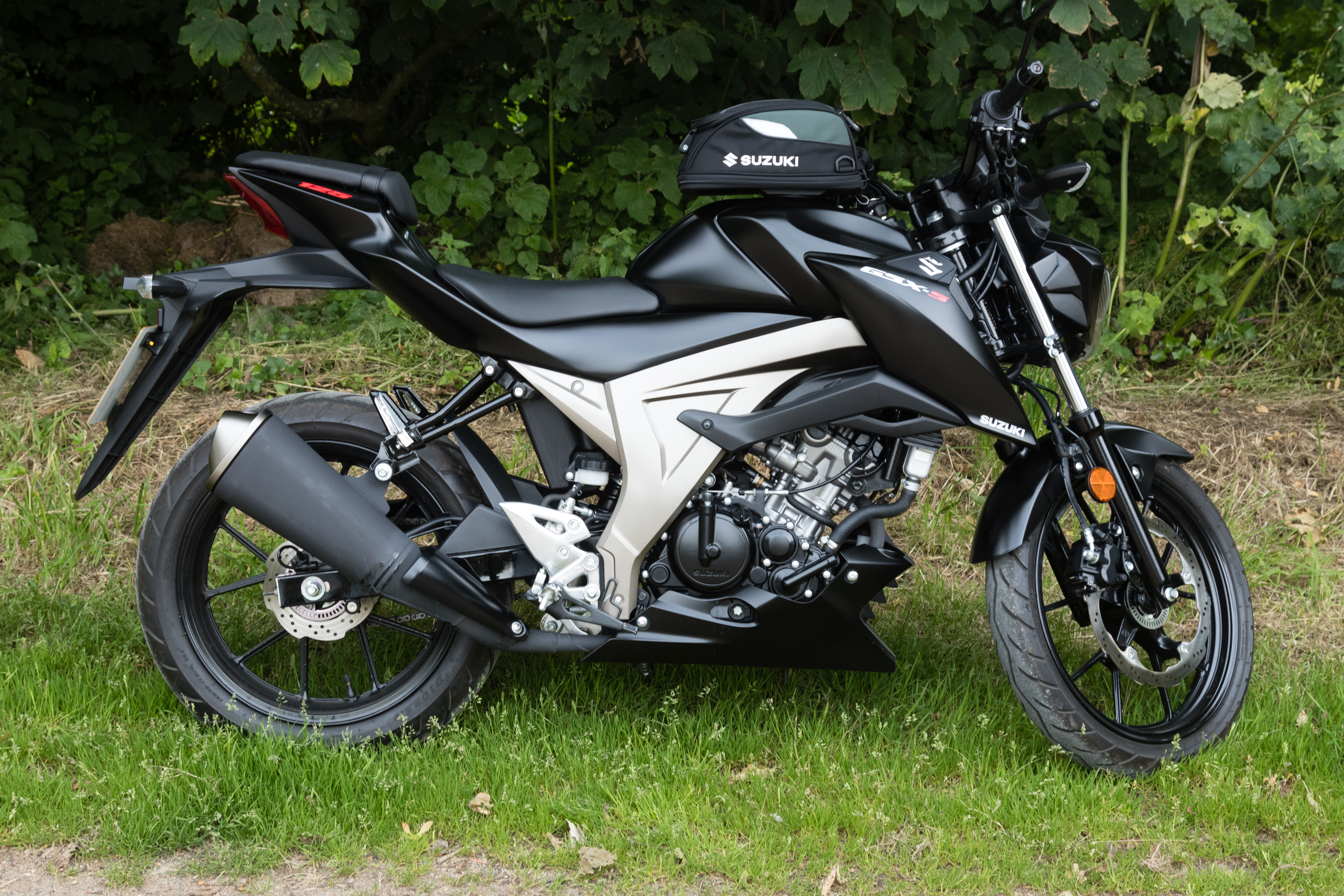
Suzuki GSX-S125, exported outside of Indonesia

=== Manufactured locally ===
==== Tambun Plant ====
Automobiles:

- Suzuki Carry (1991–present)
- Suzuki APV (2004–present)

Motorcycles:

- Suzuki Satria F150 (2007–present)
- Suzuki Nex 115 (2011–present)
- Suzuki Address 115 (2014–present)
- Suzuki GSX-R/S125 (2016–present, export only)
- Suzuki GSX-R/S150 (2016–present)
- Suzuki GSX150 Bandit (2018–2022 for domestic market, 2018–present for export markets)
- Suzuki Burgman Street 125 EX (2025–present)
- Suzuki Access 125 (2026–present)

==== Cikarang Plant ====
Automobiles:

- Suzuki Ertiga (2012–present)
- Suzuki XL7 (2020–present)
- Suzuki Fronx (2025–present)

=== Imported ===
Automobiles:

- Suzuki Jimny 3-door (2019–present, Japan-sourced)
- Suzuki S-Presso (2022–present, India-sourced)
- Suzuki Jimny 5-door (2024–present, India-sourced)
- Suzuki Grand Vitara (2023–present, India-sourced)
- Suzuki e Vitara (2026–present, India-sourced)

Motorcycles:

- Suzuki V-Strom 250 SX (2023–present, India-sourced)

== Former models ==
=== Manufactured locally ===
Automobiles:

- Suzuki Aerio/Baleno Next-G (2002–2007)
- Suzuki Baleno (1996–2002)
- Suzuki Carry Futura (1991–2019)
- Suzuki Carry ST20 (1978–1983)
- Suzuki Carry ST100 (1983–2009)
- Suzuki Escudo (1993–2007)
- Suzuki Esteem (1991–1996)
- Suzuki Forsa (1986–1989)
- Suzuki Forsa Amenity/Eleny (1989–1992)
- Suzuki Fronte (1976)
- Suzuki Grand Vitara (2006–2012)
- Suzuki Jimny (SJ410) (1982–2006)
- Suzuki Karimun (1999–2006)
- Suzuki Karimun Wagon R (2013–2021)
- Suzuki Katana (1988–2006)
- Suzuki Mega Carry (2011–2019 for domestic market, 2005–2019 for export markets)
- Suzuki Sidekick (1995–2001)
- Suzuki Swift (RS) (2007–2012)
- Suzuki SX4/Neo Baleno (2008–2013)
- Suzuki Vitara (1992–1995)
- Suzuki Grand Escudo XL-7 (2003–2006)
- Mazda VX-1 (2013–2016, consignation for Mazda)
- Mitsubishi Maven (2005–2009, consignation for Mitsubishi Motors)

Motorcycles:

- Suzuki A100 (1974–1999)
- Suzuki Arashi 125 (2006–2008)
- Suzuki FR70 (1974–1982)
- Suzuki FXR150 (2002–2003)
- Suzuki GP100 (1977–1983)
- Suzuki GP125 (1977–1984)
- Suzuki GT100 (1975–1980s)
- Suzuki GT125 (1975–1980s)
- Suzuki Hayate 125 (2011–2017)
- Suzuki Let's 115 (2012–2014)
- Suzuki RC80 (1984–1986)
- Suzuki RC100 Bravo/Sprinter (1986–2002)
- Suzuki RC110 Crystal (1990–1995)
- Suzuki RG150 (1989–1997)
- Suzuki Satria F115 Young Star (2015–2016)
- Suzuki Satria RU120 (1997–2002)
- Suzuki Shogun 110 (1996–2004)
- Suzuki Shogun 125 (2004–2013)
- Suzuki Skydrive 125 (2009–2013)
- Suzuki Skywave 125 (2007–2011)
- Suzuki Smash 110 (2003–2013)
- Suzuki Smash 115 (2013–2021)
- Suzuki Spin 125 (2006–2011)
- Suzuki Thunder GSX250 (2003–2005)
- Suzuki Thunder EN125 (2004–2011)
- Suzuki Tornado 110 (1994–1997)
- Suzuki TRS 118 (1983–1994)
- Suzuki TRZ 125 Katana (1984–1987)
- Suzuki TS100 (1979–1980s)
- Suzuki TS125 (1994–2005)

=== Imported ===
Automobiles:

- Suzuki A-Star (2011–2012, India-sourced)
- Suzuki Baleno (2017–2025, India-sourced)
- Suzuki Carry FB/L20/L40/ST10 (1962–1976, Japan-sourced)
- Suzuki Caribian (2005–2007, Thailand-sourced)
- Suzuki Celerio (2015–2017, Thailand-sourced)
- Suzuki Ciaz (2015–2017, Thailand-sourced)
- Suzuki Every Plus (2003–2004, Japan-sourced)
- Suzuki Grand Vitara (2012–2018, Japan-sourced)
- Suzuki Ignis (2017–2024, India-sourced)
- Suzuki Jimny (JB43) (2017, Japan-sourced)
- Suzuki Karimun Estilo (2007–2012, India-sourced)
- Suzuki S-Cross (2016–2023, India-sourced)
- Suzuki Splash (2010–2016, India-sourced)
- Suzuki Swift (SA) (1984–1986, Japan-sourced)
- Suzuki Swift (RS) (2005–2007, Japan-sourced)
- Suzuki Swift (AZG) (2012–2017, Thailand-sourced)
- Suzuki Swift Sport (2013–2014, Japan-sourced)
- Suzuki SX4/Neo Baleno (2007–2008, Japan-sourced)

Motorcycles:

- Suzuki Avenis 125 (2022–2025, India-sourced)
- Suzuki Bandit 250 (early 2000s, Japan-sourced)
- Suzuki Burgman 200 (mid 2010s, Thailand-sourced)
- Suzuki DR200SE (2017–2019, Japan-sourced)
- Suzuki DR-Z400 SM (mid 2010s, Japan-sourced)
- Suzuki FXR150 (2000–2002, Malaysia-sourced)
- Suzuki Gixxer SF 250 (2021–2025, India-sourced)
- Suzuki GSR750 (2014–2018, Japan-sourced)
- Suzuki GSX-R750 (early 2000s, Japan-sourced)
- Suzuki GSX-S1000F (2017–2018, Japan-sourced)
- Suzuki Hayabusa GSX1300R (early 2010s–2018, Japan-sourced)
- Suzuki GW250 Inazuma (2012–2016, China-sourced)
- Suzuki Raider 125 (early 2000s, Thailand-sourced)
- Suzuki Raider 150 (2003–2006, Thailand-sourced)
- Suzuki RK Cool 110 (early 2000s, Thailand-sourced)
- Suzuki Satria RU120 (2002–2005, Malaysia-sourced)
- Suzuki Thunder GSX250 (1999–2003, Japan-sourced)
- Suzuki V-Strom 650 (mid-2010s, Japan-sourced)

== Slogans ==
- Personal Best (1990–2005)
- Way Of Life (2005–2018)
- Small Makes Big (2015)
- Your Gear (2016–present, automobile only)
- Nyalakan Nyali (2016‐present, motorcycle only)
