= Mitsubishi Motors Krama Yudha Indonesia =

Indonesian automotive company

PT Mitsubishi Motors Krama Yudha Indonesia
- Type: Joint venture
- Industry: Automotive
- Predecessor: PT Krama Yudha Kesuma Motor; PT Krama Yudha Ratu Motor; PT Krama Yudha Tiga Berlian
- Founded: MMKI: March 2015; MMKSI: April 2017
- Headquarters: Jakarta, Indonesia
- Area served: Indonesia
- Key people: Minoru Saito (MMKI President Director)
- Products: Automobiles
- Production output: ▲193,954 units (2019); ▲164,107 units (2018); ▲61,721 units (2017)
- Owner: MMKI: Mitsubishi Motors (51%); Mitsubishi Corporation (40%); Krama Yudha Group (9%); MMKSI: Mitsubishi Corporation (40%); Mitsubishi Motors (30%); Krama Yudha Group (30%)
- Number of employees: 3,000 (2018)
- Parent: Mitsubishi Motors Corporation
- Website: www.mitsubishi-motors.co.id

PT Mitsubishi Motors Krama Yudha Indonesia (also called MMKI) is a joint venture of Mitsubishi Motors Corporation for its passenger cars and light commercial vehicle (LCV) production in Indonesia. A separate company, called PT Mitsubishi Motors Krama Yudha Sales Indonesia (also called MMKSI) handled the marketing and sales of Mitsubishi passenger cars and LCV in Indonesia. The company was a result of restructuration in April 2017 when Mitsubishi Motors (passenger cars and LCV) operations and Mitsubishi Fuso (heavy trucks) operations were separated from the former company, PT Krama Yudha Tiga Berlian (KTB). Today, KTB exclusively handled Mitsubishi Fuso production and sales in Indonesia.

In 2018, Indonesia emerged as the largest market for Mitsubishi Motors, recording 146,805 total sales.

== History ==
As the Indonesian government encouraged investments in Indonesia, PT New Marwa was established as the sole distributor of Mitsubishi vehicles in 1970. In 1973, New Marwa changed their name to PT Krama Yudha Tiga Berlian Motors (KTB). At the same time, both PT Krama Yudha Ratu Motor (KRM) and PT Mitsubishi Krama Yudha Motors and Manufacturing (MKM) was established to operate their new manufacturing plant in Pulo Gadung, Jakarta. Mitsubishi then quickly gained popularity in Indonesia as the manufacturer of durable LCVs and heavy commercial trucks. The 'Colt' nameplate, being the most popular and most used commercial vehicle nameplate in the country helped Mitsubishi gain popularity.

In 1980, KTB took over PT Pipit Motor Jakarta, converting it to PT Krama Yudha Kesuma Motor (KKM) to assemble passenger cars in Tanjung Priok, Jakarta.

In 1997, KTB was planning to launch an Asian Utility Vehicle (AUV) designed to compete with Toyota Kijang, the best-selling car in Indonesia for more than a decade. However, the Southeast Asian economic crisis pushed back the launch schedule to 1999 when Mitsubishi Kuda was launched in Indonesia. However, the car was never a big success. As their passenger car sales swiftly declined, KTB closed the plant in 2005, effectively ending Mitsubishi Galant and Mitsubishi Kuda assembly in Indonesia.

In 2015, Mitsubishi Motors announced that it would launch an entry-level MPV in Indonesia to compete with Toyota Avanza. On March 24, 2015, Mitsubishi Motors started the construction of a new manufacturing plant in Cikarang, West Java, with the maximum production capacity of 160,000 vehicles per year and established MMKI at the same time. The plant was opened in April 2017. Since 1 April 2017, the passenger cars and LCV operations was transferred from KTB to MMKSI, leaving KTB with sales and production of Mitsubishi Fuso trucks. Mitsubishi Xpander, the entry-level MPV, was launched in August 2017.

As the demand for the Xpander model is higher than expected, Mitsubishi Motors invested an additional Rp 540 billion to increase the plant production capacity from the current 160,000 units to 220,000 units in fiscal 2020, and to open up to 800 jobs, bringing the total to 4,100 workers. Of the 220,000 units, the Xpander would contribute around 160,000 units of production.

=== Football club ===
From 1984 to 1992, the Palembang branch of the predecessor company operated an association football club named Krama Yudha Tiga Berlian, which competed in Galatama, Indonesia's semi-professional football league. It won the Galatama title in 1985 and 1986–1987 seasons.

== Facility ==
MMKI began passenger cars and LCV production in April 2017. The manufacturing plant is located in Greenland International Industrial Center (GIIC), an industrial estate located in Kota Deltamas, Cikarang, Bekasi Regency, West Java. The total investment is approximately 20 million yen. It has the maximum production capacity of 160,000 vehicles per year in a total area of 30 ha with the number of employees of approximately 3,000 people. The plant manufactured the Xpander, Pajero Sport, Colt L300 and supplied Xpander-based Nissan Livina to Nissan Motor Indonesia as a result of Renault–Nissan–Mitsubishi Alliance strategic partnership. MMKI also exported the Xpander to various countries, including Thailand, Philippines, Vietnam, Egypt, Syria, Bolivia and other countries.

Meanwhile, the predecessor company, KTB operated an automobile assembly facility PT Krama Yudha Ratu Motor in Pulo Gadung, Jakarta. The facility was opened in 1973 and manufactured passenger cars, LCVs and heavy commercial vehicles throughout the years. It has the maximum production capacity of 150,000 vehicles per year. The plant manufactured Mitsubishi Fuso vehicles, while previously it also produced the Colt L300 and Colt T120SS light commercial vehicles, and Outlander Sport from kits imported from Japan.

== Models ==
=== Current models ===
Model	Indonesian introduction	Current model		Current production status
Model	Indonesian introduction	Introduction (generation)	Update/facelift	Current production status
SUV/crossover
Xforce	2023	2023 (first)	—	Assembled in Indonesia
Destinator	2025	2025 (first)	—	Assembled in Indonesia
Pajero Sport	2009	2016 (third)	2024	Assembled in Indonesia
MPV
Xpander	2017	2017 (first)	2025	Assembled in Indonesia
Pickup truck
Triton	2005 (as L200 Strada)	2024 (sixth)	—	Imported from Thailand
Light commercial vehicle
L100 EV	1977 (L100 nameplate)	2023 (sixth)	—	Assembled in Indonesia
Colt L300	1981	1981 (second)	2022	Assembled in Indonesia

=== Former models ===
==== Manufactured locally ====
- Mitsubishi Colt T100
- Mitsubishi Colt T200
- Mitsubishi Colt T120SS (platform sharing with Suzuki)
- Mitsubishi Eterna
- Mitsubishi Galant
- Mitsubishi Galant Sigma
- Mitsubishi Jetstar
- Mitsubishi Kuda
- Mitsubishi Lancer
- Mitsubishi Maven (consignation from Suzuki)
- Mitsubishi Mirage
- Mitsubishi Outlander Sport
- Isuzu Bison (consignation for Isuzu)
- Jeep J20 (consignation for Jeep)
- Nissan Livina (consignation for Nissan)

==== Imported ====
- Mitsubishi Colt L300
- Mitsubishi Delica
- Mitsubishi Eclipse Cross
- Mitsubishi Grandis
- Mitsubishi Lancer
- Mitsubishi Mirage
- Mitsubishi Outlander PHEV
- Mitsubishi Pajero
- Mitsubishi Pajero Sport

== Annual production and sales ==
Fiscal Year	Production			Sales
Fiscal Year	KKM	KRM	MMKI	Sales
2000	24,156	20,253	-	42,481
2001	6,006	26,736	-	34,156
2002	12,166	37,768	-	51,268
2003	7,470	31,908	-	41,982
2004	5,760	42,024	-	50,654
2005	885	35,172	-	42,776
2006	-	15,172	-	23,007
2007	-	25,299	-	33,826
2008	-	28,693	-	38,870
2009	-	24,744	-	36,127
2010	-	43,992		59,081
2011	-	55,774	-	73,254
2012	-	61,140	-	87,030
2013	-	63,186	-	93,362
2014	-	56,925	-	83,747
2015	-	45,468	-	76,288
2016	-	33,665	107	65,415
2017	-	35,183	53,667	103,858
2018	-	7,008	167,248	140,191

(Sources: Facts & Figures 2000, Facts & Figures 2005, Facts & Figures 2008, Facts & Figures 2010, Facts & Figures 2013, Facts & Figures 2018, Facts & Figures 2019, Mitsubishi Motors website)
