= Suzuki APV =

Suzuki APV (DN)
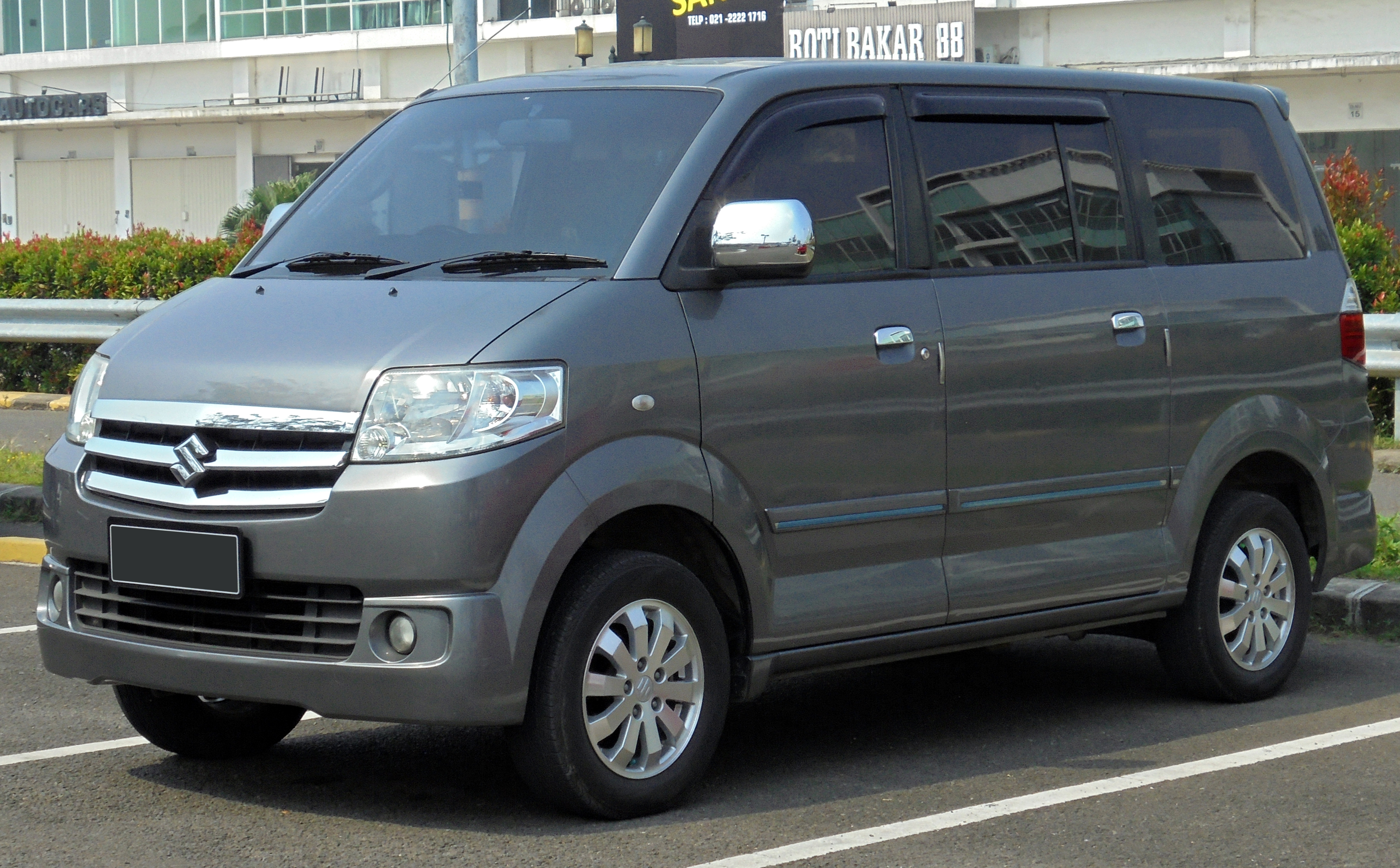
- Suzuki APV Arena SGX (facelift, Indonesia)

Overview
- Manufacturer: Suzuki
- Also called: Suzuki APV Arena; Suzuki Carry (pickup truck; international); Suzuki Mega Carry (pickup truck; Indonesia & Pakistan); Suzuki Super Carry Pro (pickup truck, Vietnam); Mitsubishi Maven (van; Indonesia)
- Production: August 2004–present (until January 2019 for pickup truck); September 2005–2009 (Mitsubishi Maven)
- Assembly: Indonesia: Bekasi, West Java (Tambun Plant; Suzuki Indomobil Motor)
- Designer: Hisanori Matsushima, Tsutomu Musashiya and Takamitsu Fukuda

Body and chassis
- Class: Minivan; Light commercial vehicle
- Body style: 5-door van; 5-door panel van; 2-door pickup
- Layout: Front mid-engine, rear-wheel-drive

Powertrain
- Engine: Petrol: 1.5 L G15A SOHC 16V MPI I4; 1.5 L 4G15 SOHC 12V MPI I4 (Maven); 1.6 L G16A SOHC 16V MPI I4
- Transmission: 5-speed manual; 4-speed AW03-72LE automatic (APV only)

Dimensions
- Wheelbase: 2,625 mm (103 in)
- Length: 4,155–4,230 mm (164–167 in); 4,155–4,405 mm (164–173 in) (pickup truck)
- Width: 1,655 mm (65 in); 1,660–1,750 mm (65–69 in) (pickup truck)
- Height: 1,860–1,880 mm (73–74 in); 1,865 mm (73 in) (pickup truck)
- Curb weight: 1,140–1,340 kg (2,513–2,954 lb); 1,115–1,240 kg (2,458–2,734 lb) (pickup truck); 1,260–1,305 kg (2,778–2,877 lb) (Mitsubishi Maven)

Chronology
- Predecessor: Suzuki Every Plus/Carry 1.3; Suzuki Carry Futura (upmarket van variants); Mitsubishi Kuda (for Mitsubishi Maven)
- Successor: Suzuki Carry 1.5 (for pickup truck); Mitsubishi Xpander (for Mitsubishi Maven)

The Suzuki APV is a minivan/light commercial vehicle designed by Suzuki in Japan and manufactured in Indonesia by Suzuki Indomobil Motor. The abbreviation "APV" is short for All Purpose Vehicle. It is powered by either 1.5 liter or 1.6 liter inline-four G series engine delivering 92–105 PS (91–104 hp; 68–77 kW).

The pickup truck version is called Suzuki Mega Carry in Indonesia, Super Carry Pro in Vietnam and APV Pickup elsewhere. It was discontinued in February 2019 in favour of the international version of the Carry 1.5.

The APV was exported from Indonesia in April 2005 to more than 100 countries in Southeast Asia, Latin America, the Caribbean, Middle East, South Asia, North Africa and Oceania. Suzuki invested JP¥ 11.5 billion to produce a targeted 70,000 units per year in Indonesia.

== Models ==
=== APV ===
The original APV was launched in September 2004, initially it was available in three trim levels: A, L and X. It is available in three trim levels with standard equipment as Blind Van, GA and GE. The car is only offered with 5-speed manual transmission, live axle rear suspension with leaf springs, 14" steel wheels and black colored interior.

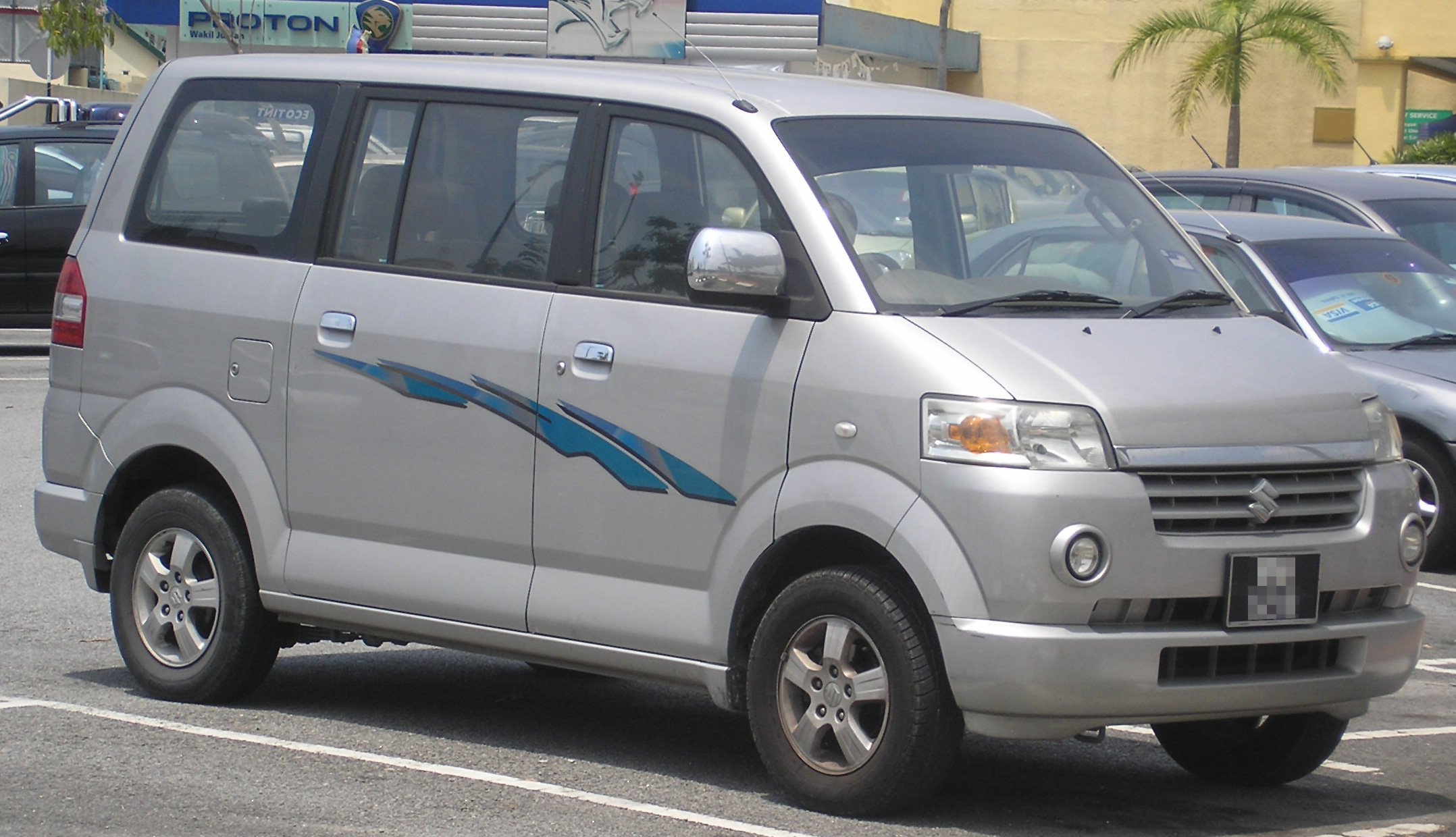
Suzuki APV GLX (pre-facelift, Malaysia)

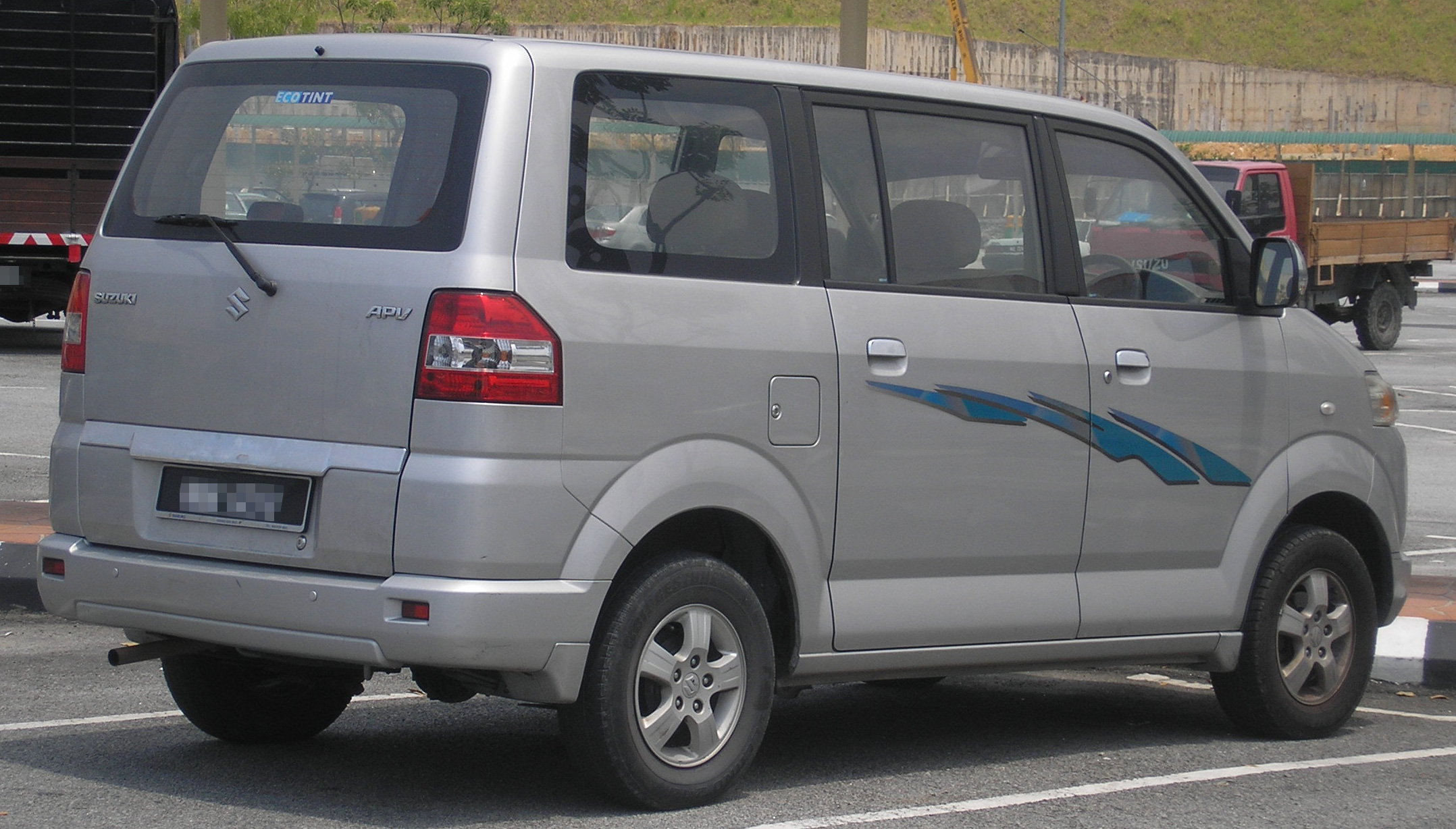
Suzuki APV GLX (pre-facelift, Malaysia)

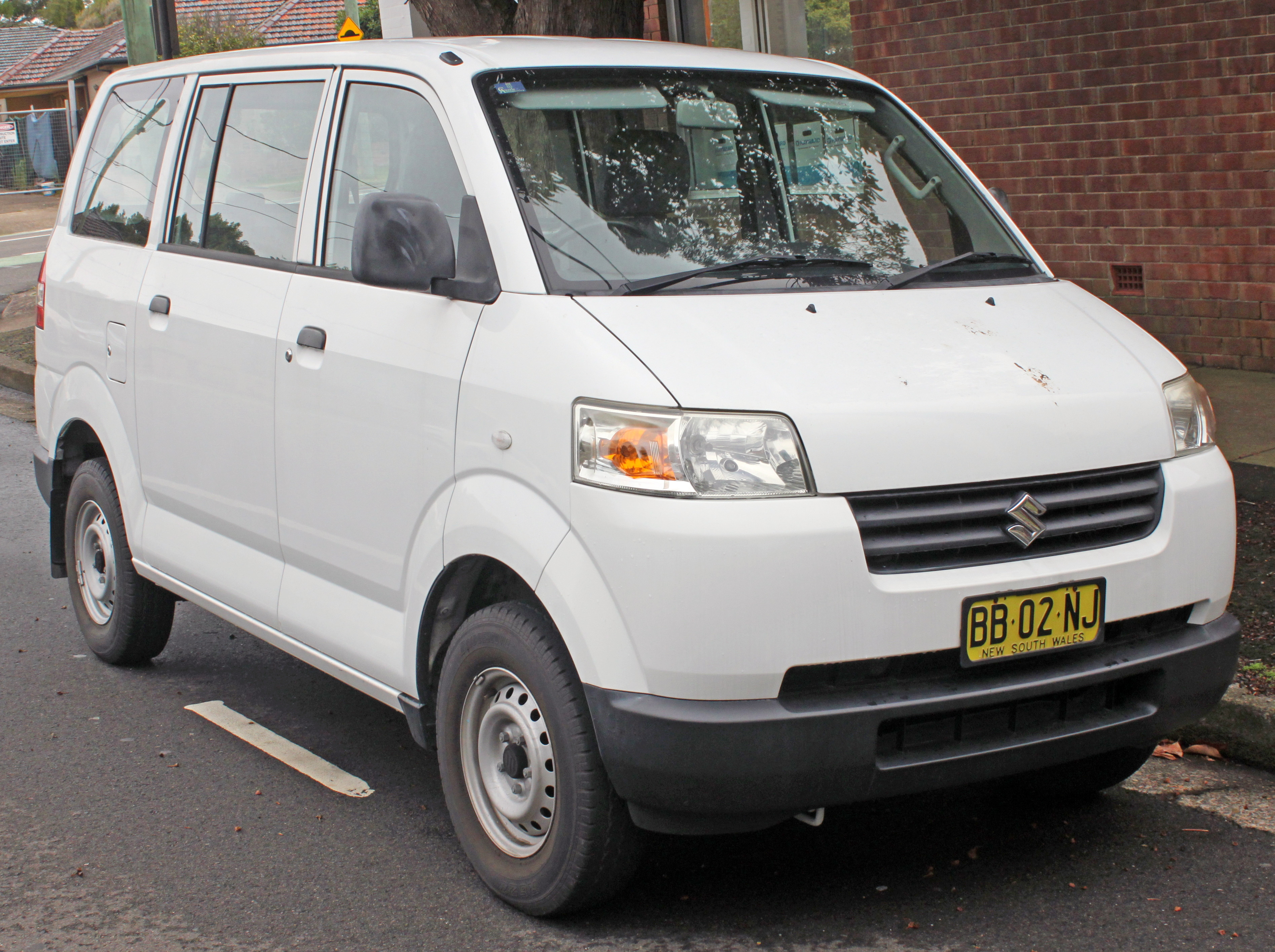
Suzuki APV van (Australia)

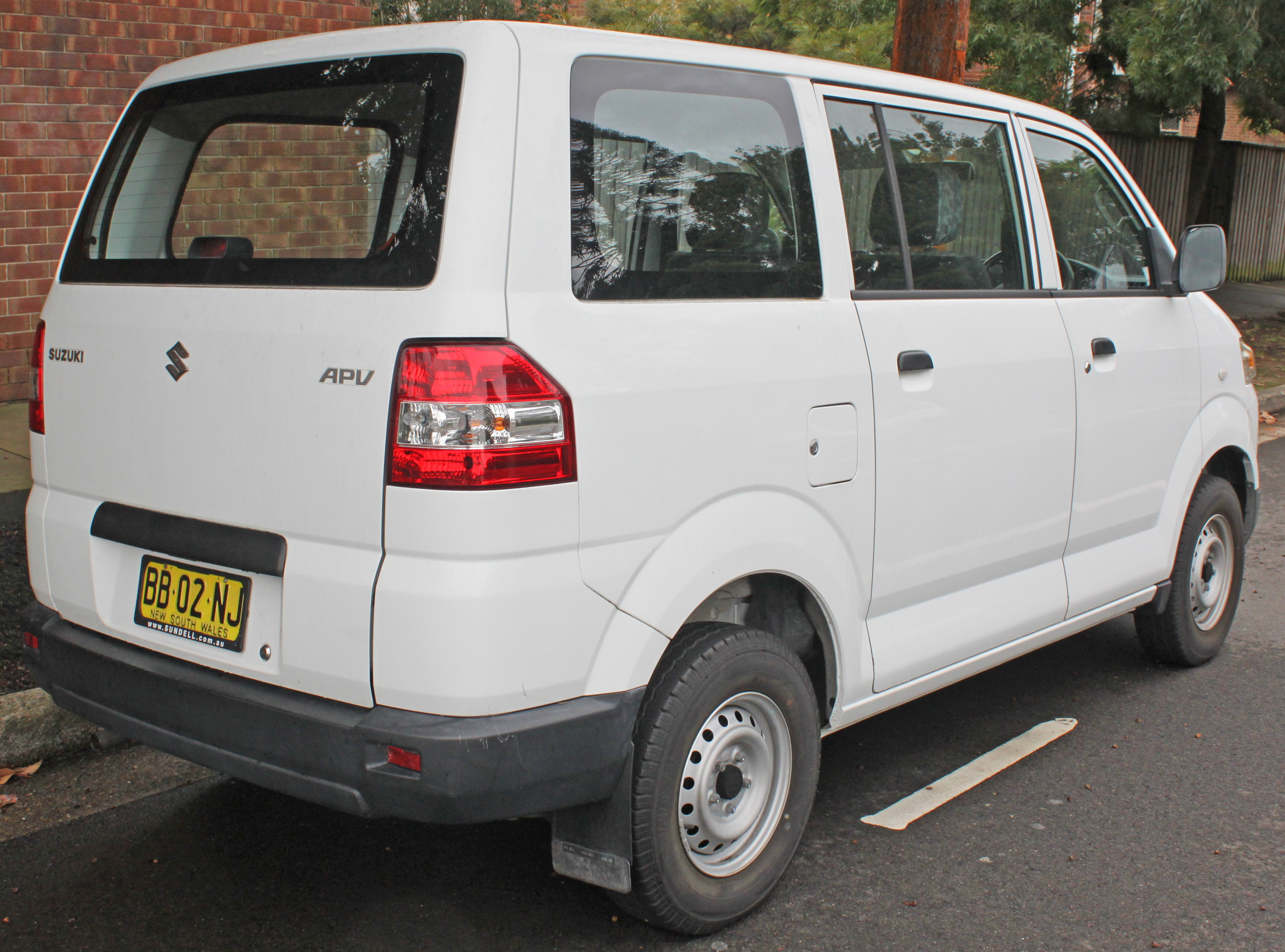
Suzuki APV van (Australia)

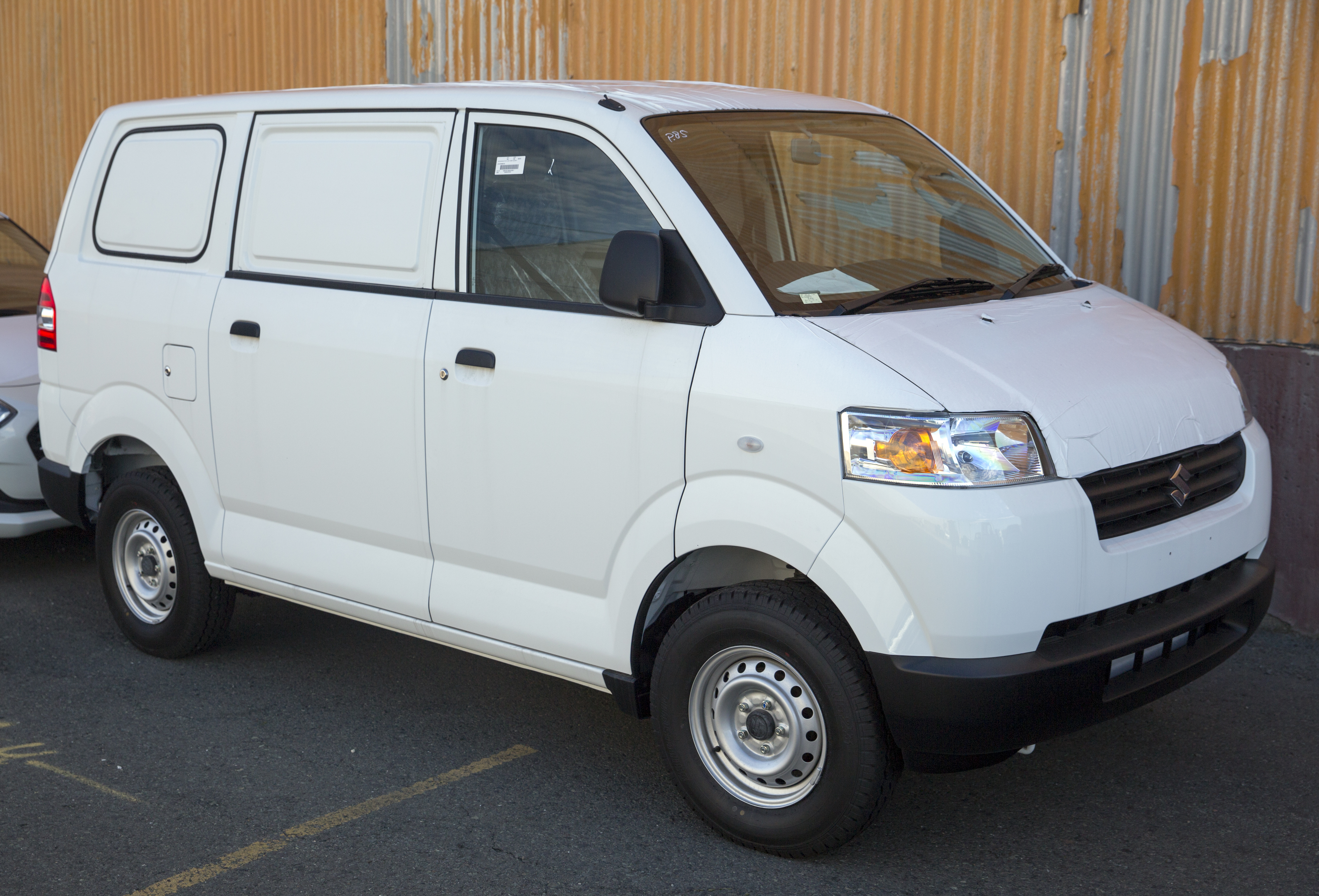
Suzuki APV blind van (Caribbean)

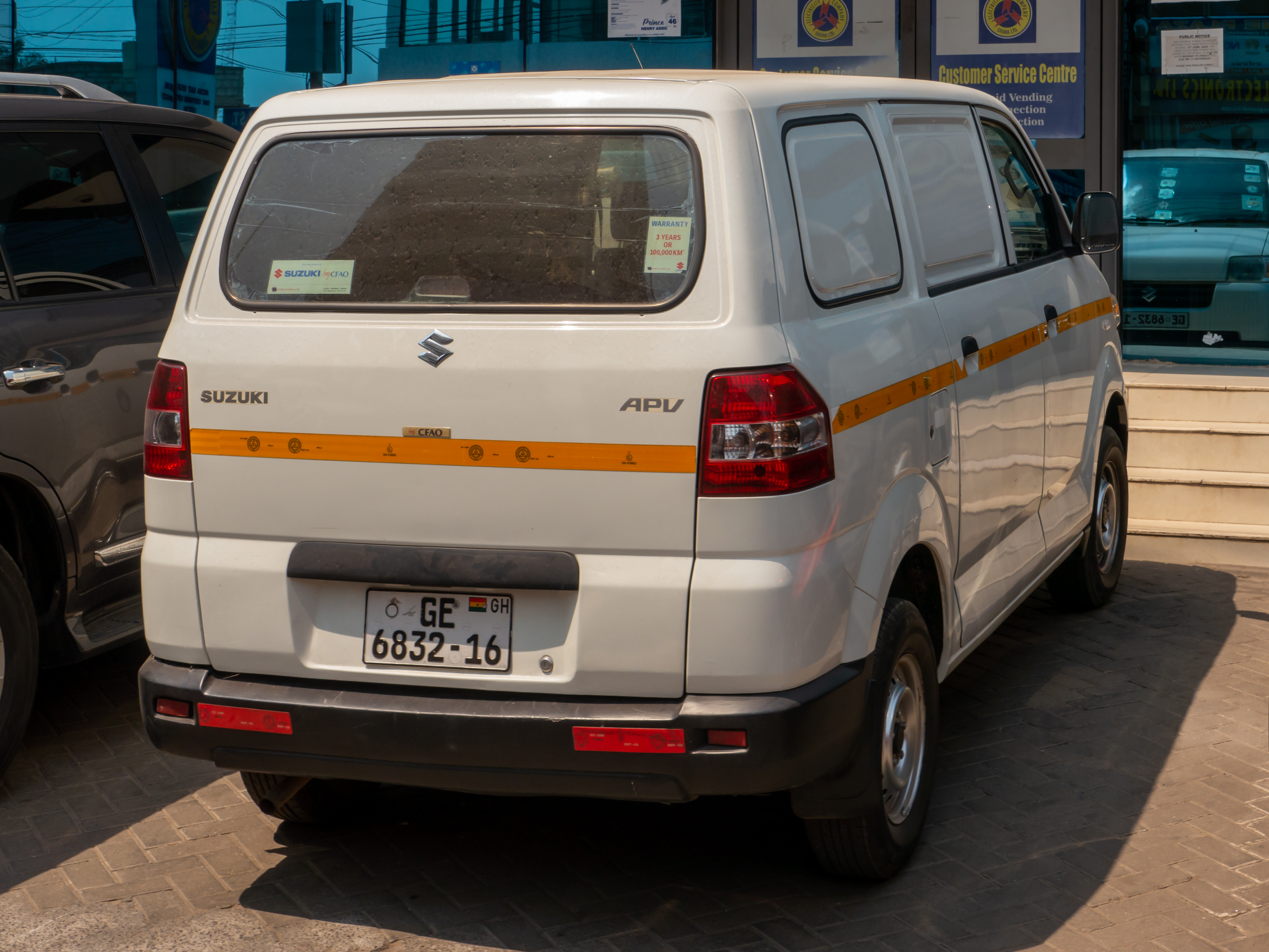
Suzuki APV blind van (Ghana)

=== APV Arena ===
In November 2007, Suzuki released the facelifted version in Indonesia named APV Arena (APV Type II in some countries). It offers more luxurious features with the SGX trim as the top-of-the-line variant (available with captain seat version). Interior is also changed as well and an improvement in engine performance. Available in three trim levels: GL, GX and SGX. Available in either 5-speed manual or 4-speed automatic transmission, live axle rear suspension with 3-link suspension plus coil springs, 15" alloy wheels and beige coloured interior.

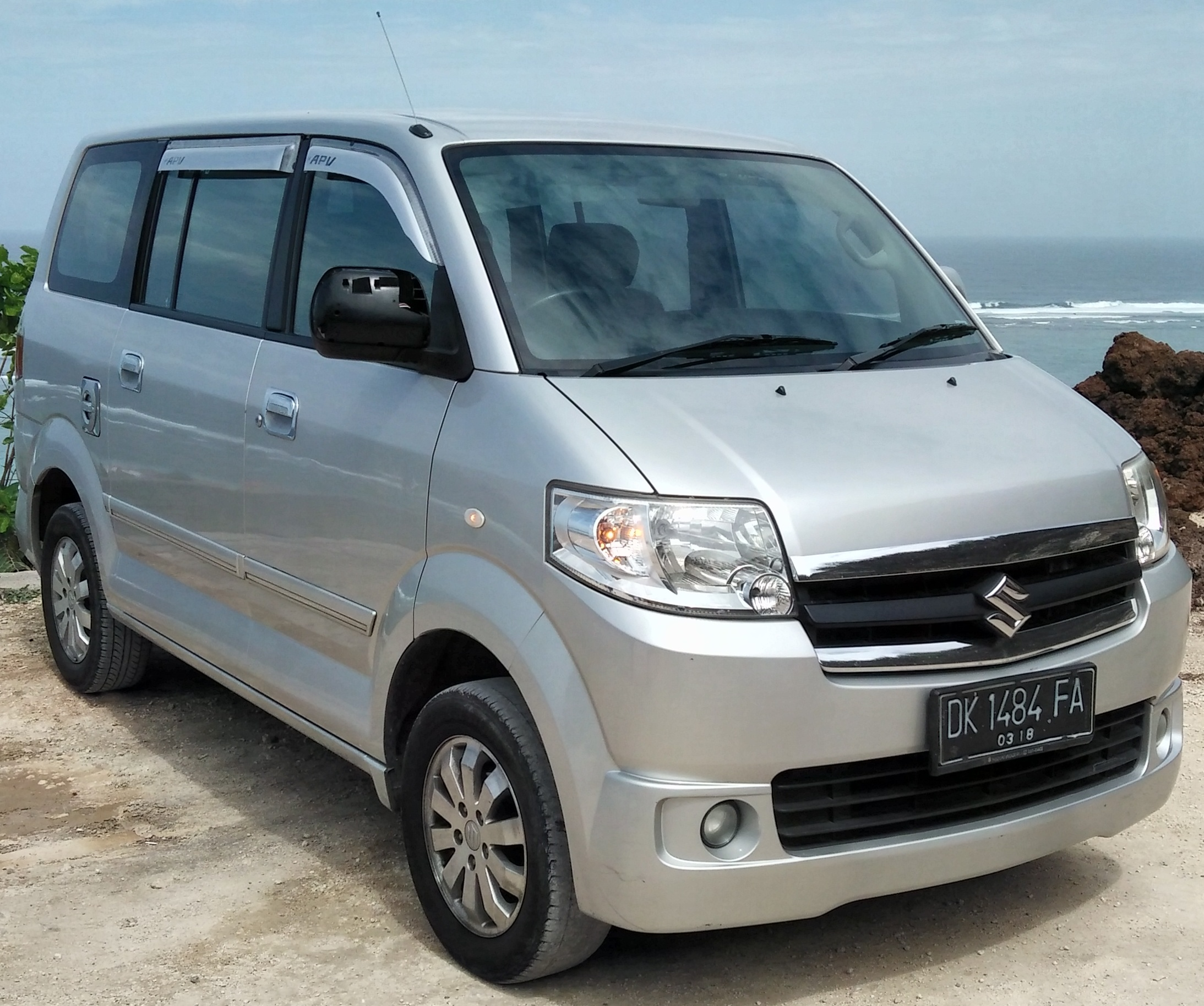
Suzuki APV Arena GX (facelift, Indonesia)

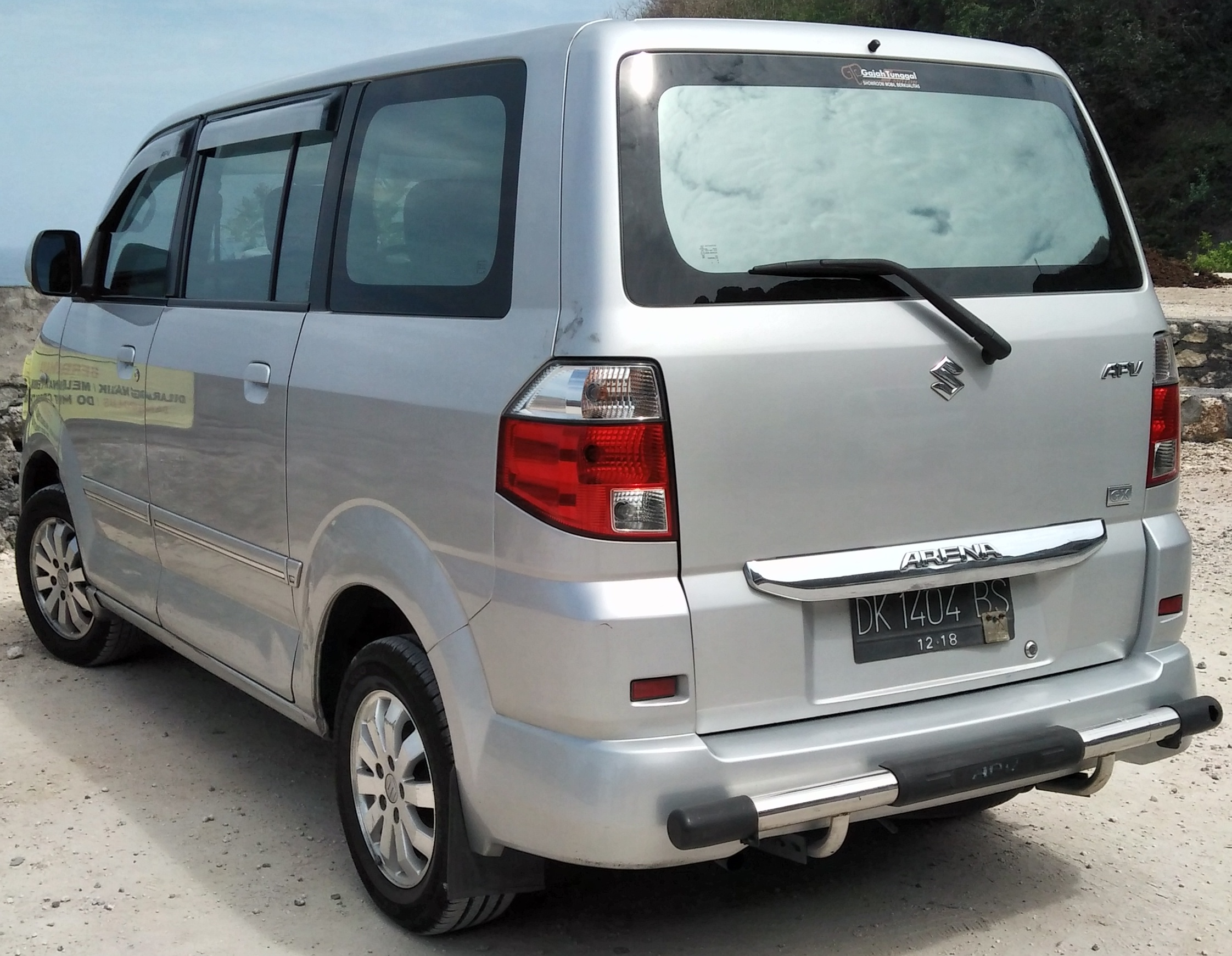
Suzuki APV Arena GX (facelift, Indonesia)

=== APV Arena Luxury ===
The Luxury variant of the APV Arena was launched in March 2009. This model was inspired by the Suzuki APV which was modified by AutoSpot and exhibited at IIMS 2008. It is based on the Arena SGX trim with several exterior makeover. It received a facelift in September 2014 with redesigned grille, bumpers and bigger 17" alloy wheels. Available in either 5-speed manual or 4-speed automatic transmission.

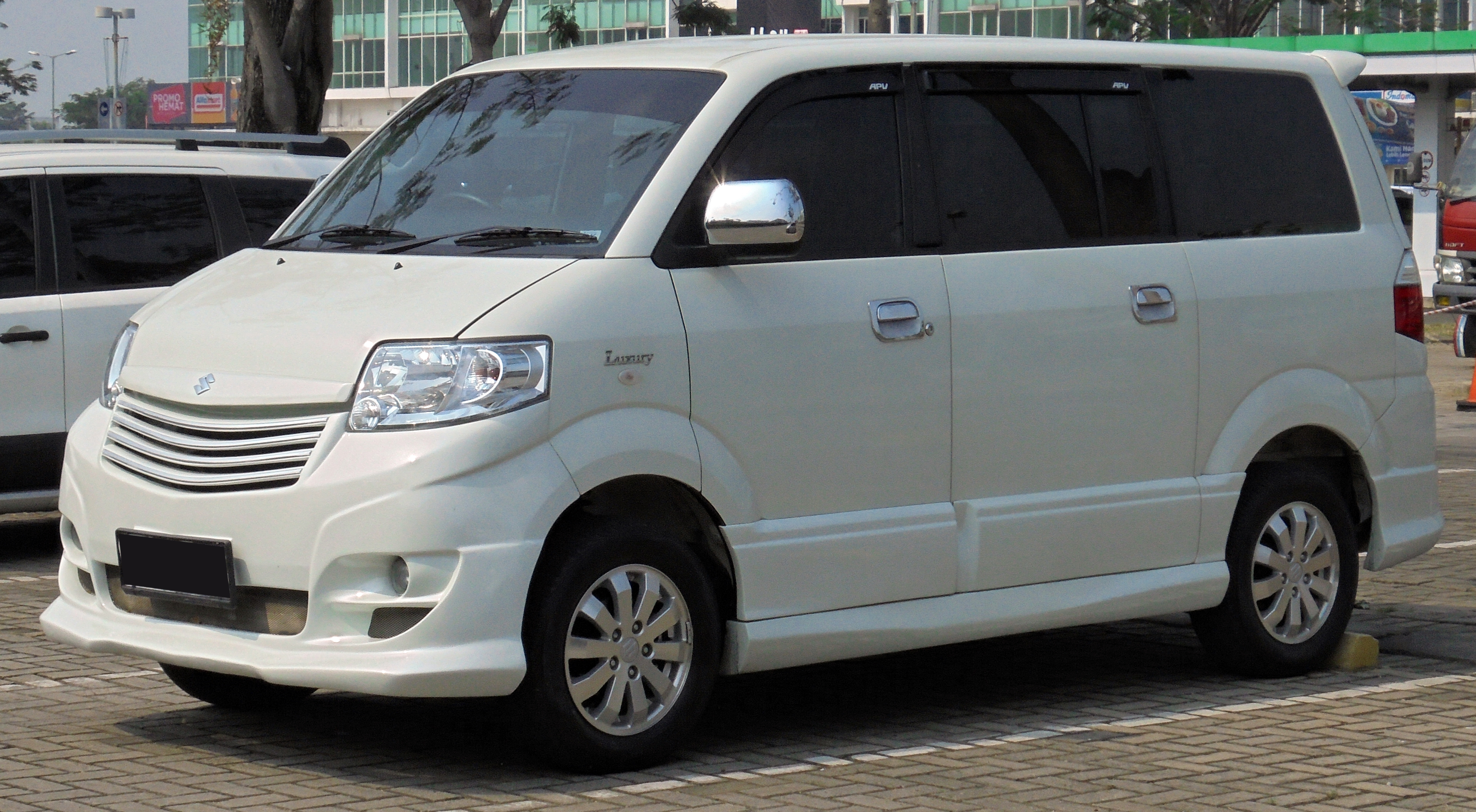
Suzuki APV Arena SGX Luxury (pre-facelift, Indonesia)

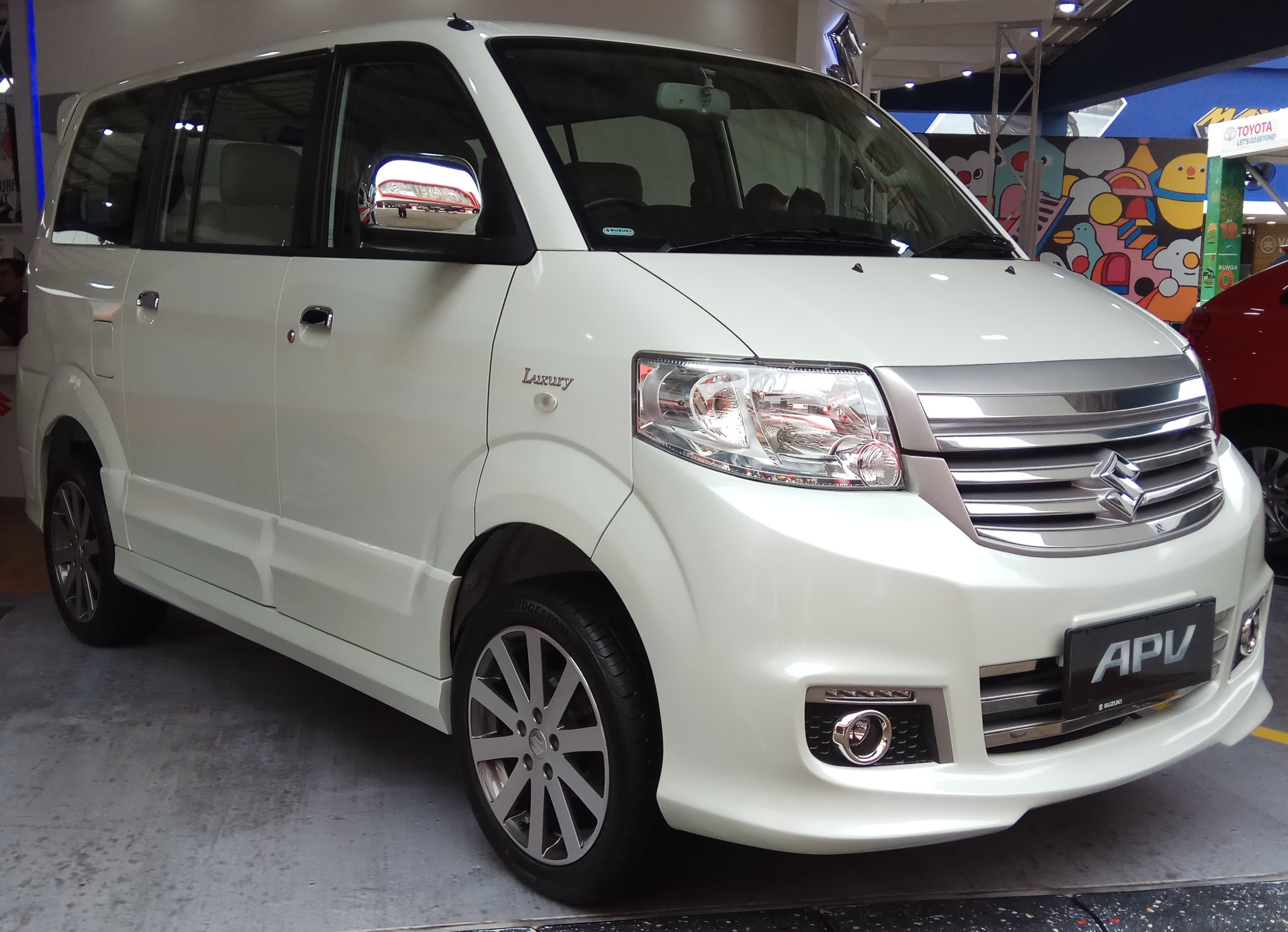
Suzuki APV Arena SGX Luxury (facelift, Indonesia)

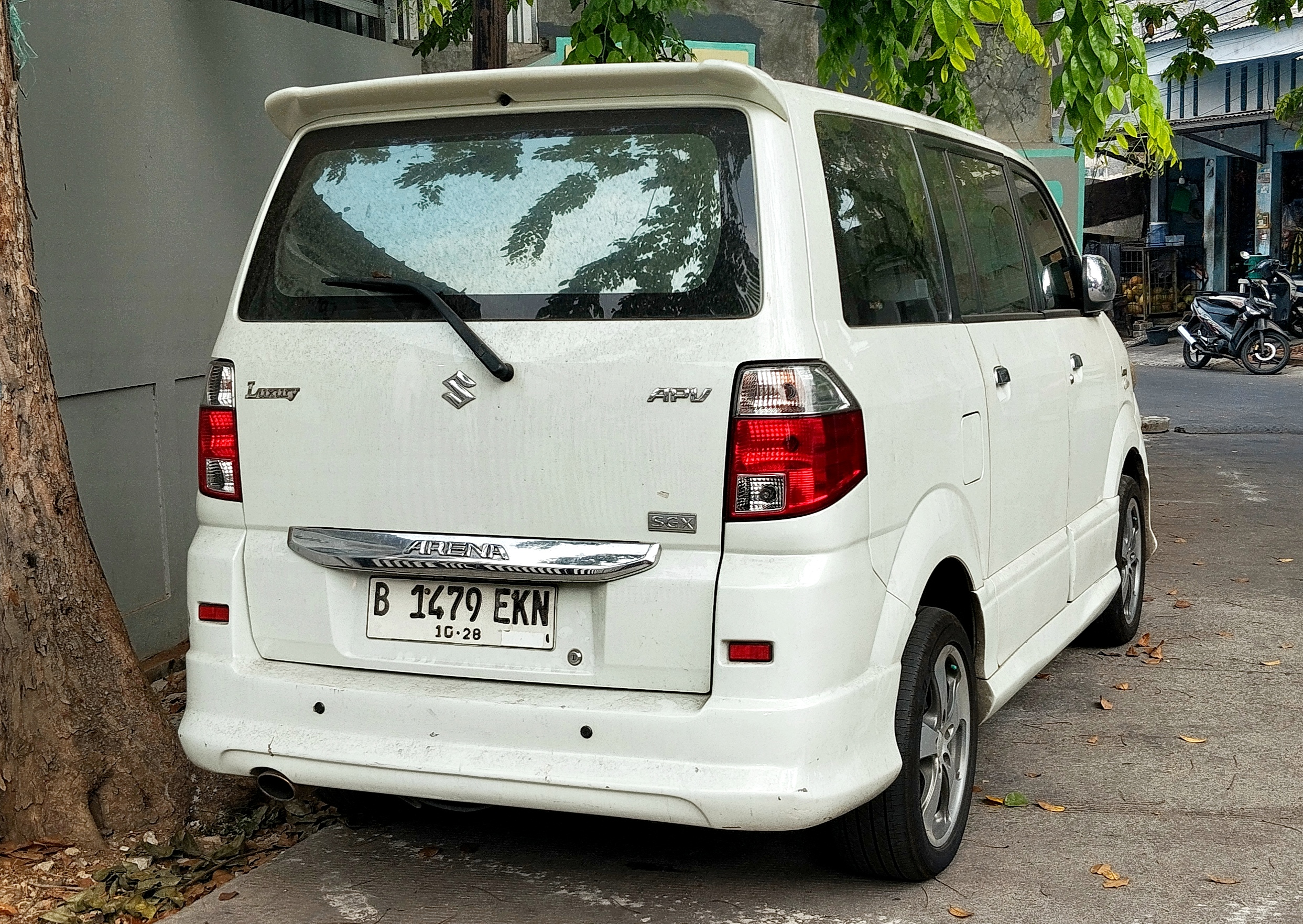
Rear view (facelift)

=== Mega Carry ===
The pickup truck version of the original APV was launched in April 2005 for international market. It became available for its home market in Indonesia in February 2011 as the Mega Carry and was marketed alongside the smaller Carry. The truck is offered in three variants: Standard short deck, Xtra long deck and special order Box model. It is only offered with 5-speed manual transmission. The Carry, Mega Carry, and the smaller Carry Futura sales were discontinued in February 2019 and replaced by Carry 1.5.

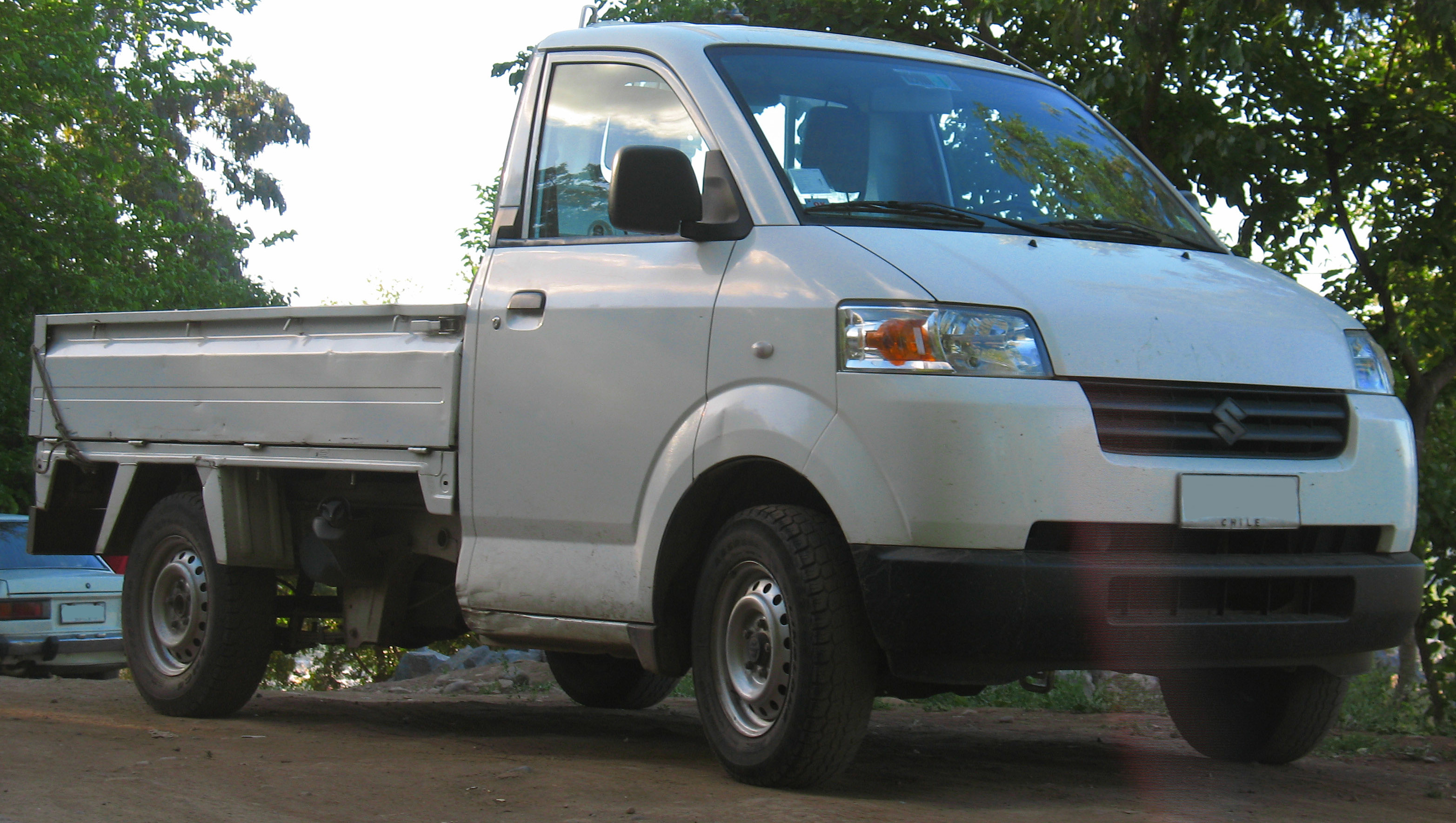
Suzuki Carry short deck (Chile)

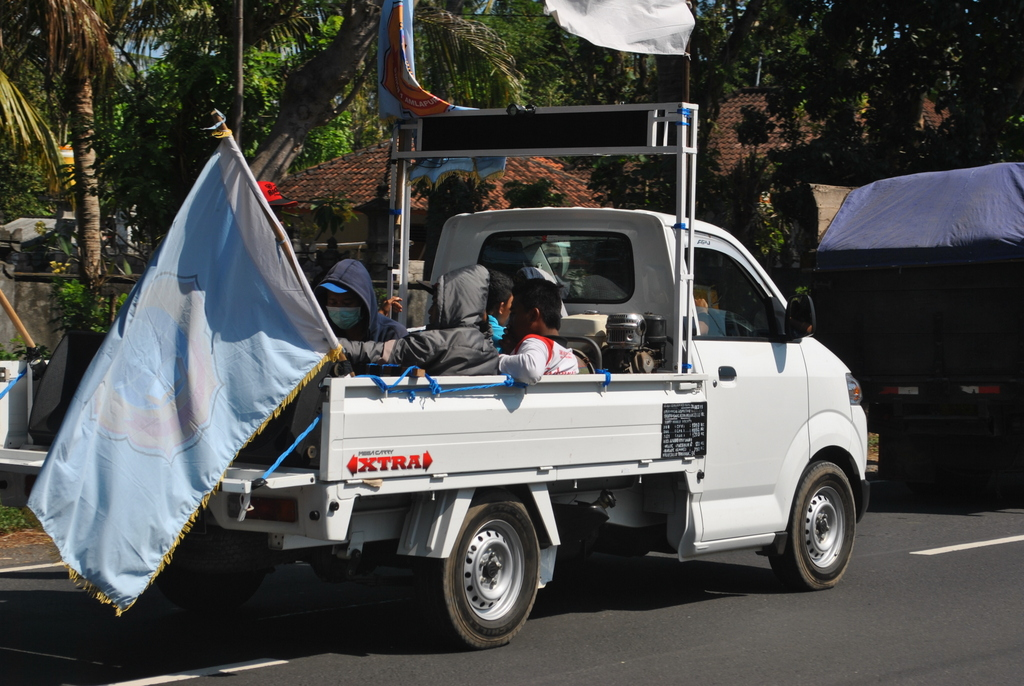
Suzuki Mega Carry Xtra long deck (Indonesia)

== Mitsubishi Maven ==
The APV was also sold by Mitsubishi Motors in Indonesia from 2005 until 2009 as the Mitsubishi Maven. It features a redesigned front fascia and minor exterior cosmetic changes. It was also built by Suzuki Indomobil Motor at their production plant.

It was available in two trim levels, GLX and GLS; both powered by a 1468 cc 4G15 SOHC four-cylinder petrol engine that produces 65 kW (87 hp; 88 PS) at 5,750 rpm and 114.7 N⋅m (84.6 lb⋅ft) of torque at 2,750 rpm. The engine was supplied by Mitsubishi's Indonesian engine production partner, PT Mitsubishi Krama Yudha Motors and Manufacturing. The engine was also used in the Colt T120SS, which in turn is a rebadged Carry Futura.

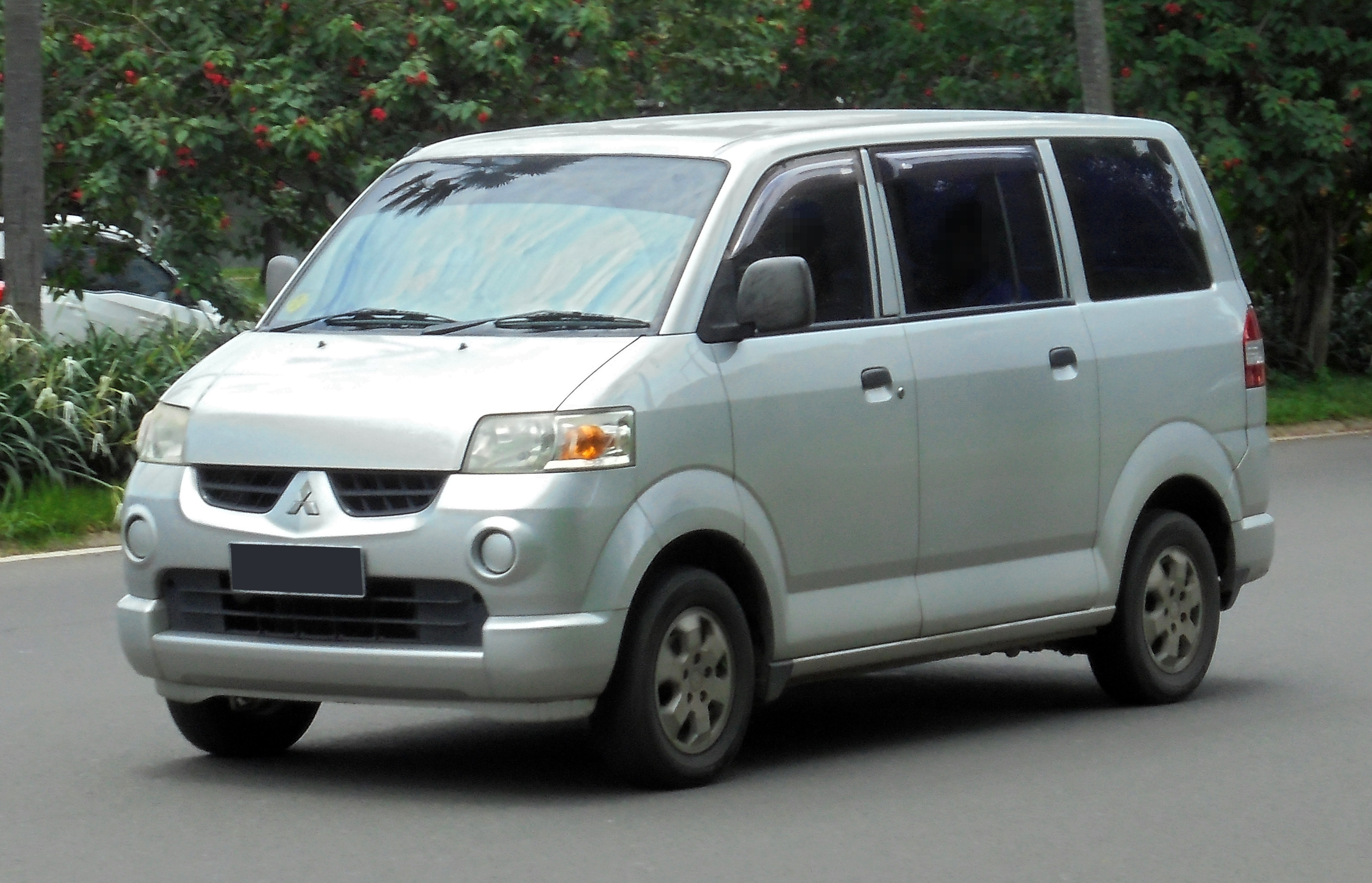
2006 Mitsubishi Maven GLX

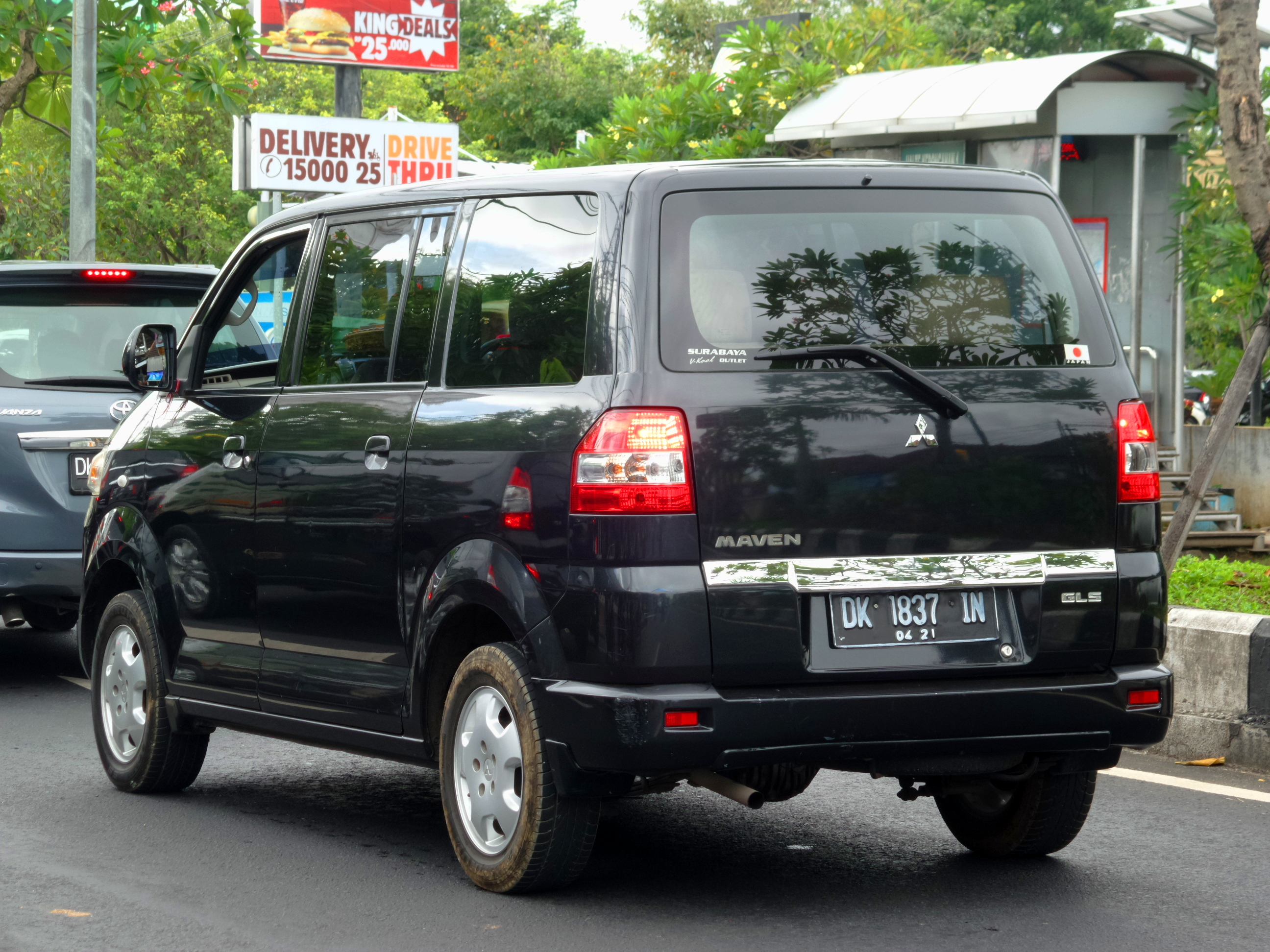
2006 Mitsubishi Maven GLS

== Safety ==
From early 2017 onwards, the APV models in Indonesia were equipped with dual airbags. This feature is available as standard safety equipment in selected markets, but it still lacks ABS. For the Mega Carry version, it is only available with three-point seat belts.

ASEAN NCAP test results Suzuki Carry (2017)
Test	Points
Overall:	0 /5 stars
Adult occupant:	17.14
Child occupant:	NA
Safety assist:	0.00

ANCAP test results Suzuki APV van variants (2008)
Test	Score
Overall	3 /5 stars
Frontal offset	7.54/16
Side impact	16/16
Pole	Not Assessed
Seat belt reminders	0/3
Whiplash protection	Not Assessed
Pedestrian protection	Marginal
Electronic stability control	Not Available

== Sales ==
Year	Indonesia (Note: Figures based on wholesale)			Malaysia (Note: Figures based on registration)
Year	APV	Mega Carry	Mitsubishi Maven	Malaysia
2004	19,545			
2005	27,882		801	349
2006	12,583		994	500
2007	12,434		777	331
2008	19,695		627	18
2009	12,555		287	1
2010	18,024		181	0
2011	18,349	11,740	18	0
2012	15,333	15,744		0
2013	14,531	19,567		0
2014	10,667	21,221		6
2015	6,732	17,635		1
2016	6,112	13,161		2
2017	5,149	12,507		
2018	3,696	15,899		
2019	3,932	1,277		
2020	3,240			
2021	2,531			
2022	2,682			
2023	3,405			
2024	2,908			
2025	2,256			
