= Suzuki TS series =

Suzuki TS185
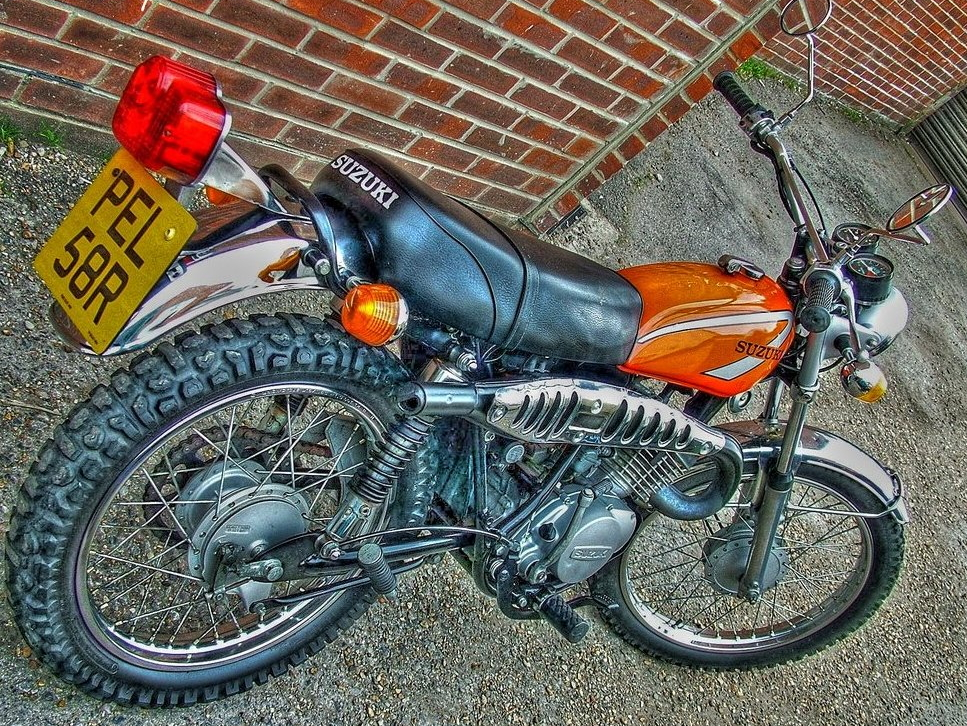
- TS185 motorcycle (HDR image by David Bryson)
- Manufacturer: Suzuki
- Production: 1971-2015 (specs from 2015)
- Class: Dual-sport
- Engine: 183 cc (11.2 cu in), air-cooled, piston port, two-stroke single
- Bore / stroke: 64.0 mm × 57.0 mm (2.52 in × 2.24 in)
- Compression ratio: 6.0:1
- Top speed: 86 mph (138 km/h)
- Power: 18 hp (13 kW) @ 6,000 rpm
- Ignition type: Electronic ignition (CDI)
- Transmission: 5-speed constant mesh manual
- Frame type: Double-cradle tubular steel
- Suspension: F: Telescopic, coil spring, oil damped R: Swingarm type, coil spring, oil damped, preload 5-way adjustable
- Brakes: F: Drum R: drum
- Tires: F: 2.75-21 45P, tube type R: 4.10-18 59P, tube type
- Wheelbase: 1,375 mm (54.1 in)
- Dimensions: L: 2,160 mm (85 in); W: 860 mm (34 in); H: 1,125 mm (44.3 in)
- Seat height: 835 mm (32.9 in)
- Weight: 102 kg (225 lb) (wet)
- Fuel capacity: 7.0 L (1.5 imp gal; 1.8 US gal)

The Suzuki TS series is a family of two-stroke, dual-sport motorcycles made by Suzuki since 1969. The series was the first Suzuki trail bikes sold on the mass market. Most of the TS line had an air-cooled engine and most models were introduced alongside the closely related TM (Motocross) or TC (trail) models, TF (farm) and also the DS (for Dirt Sport, which had no turn signals, and simplified lighting) which in most cases shared engine and chassis designs. In Japan, this family of bikes was marketed as the "Hustler", a name used on a kei car in Japan since 2014.

Suzuki's first mass market motocross bike, the TM400 Cyclone, was introduced in 1971 and was based on the TS that first sold in 1969. A TS185ER model was available in a few countries.

== Models ==
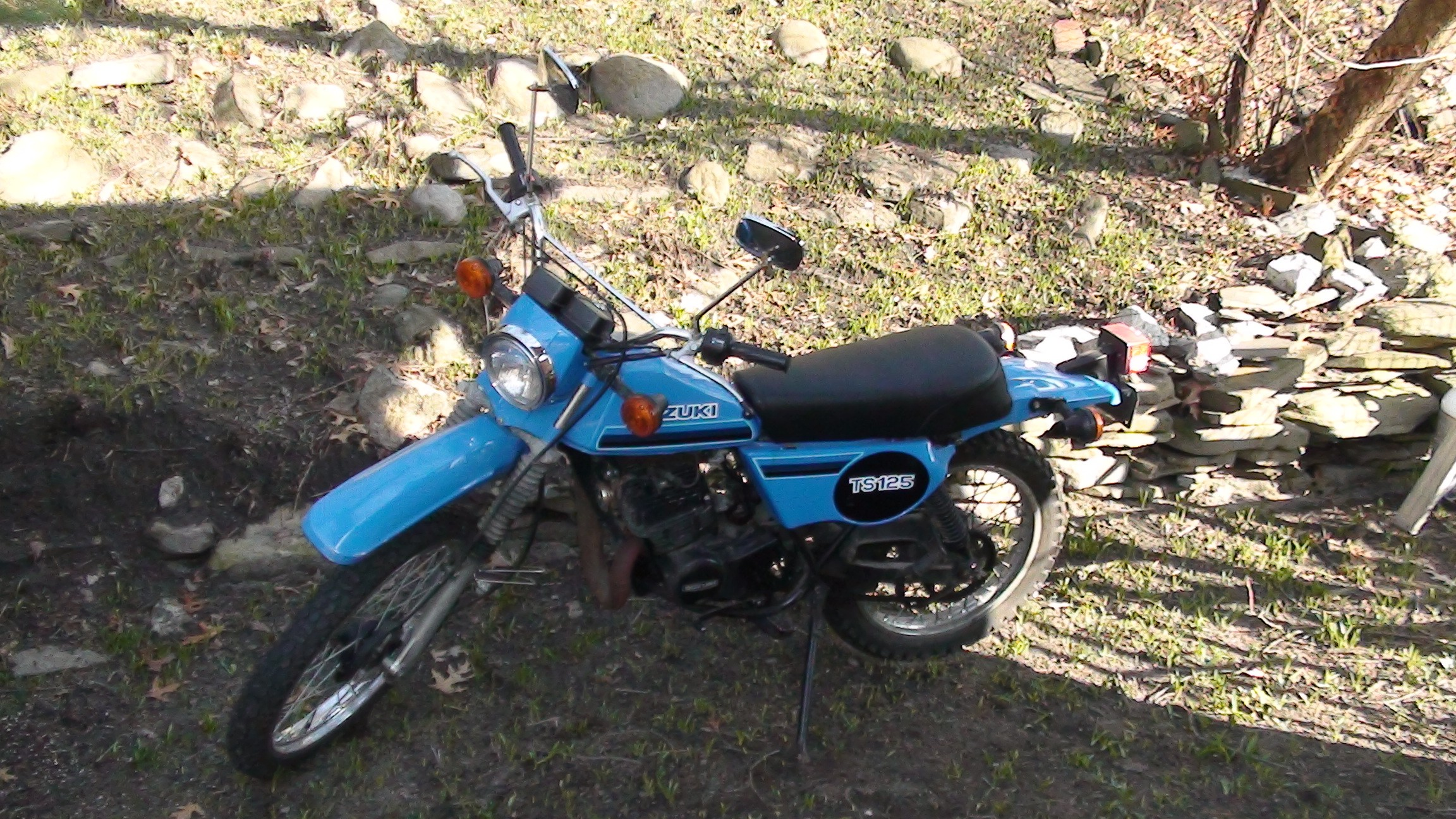
1981 Suzuki TS125

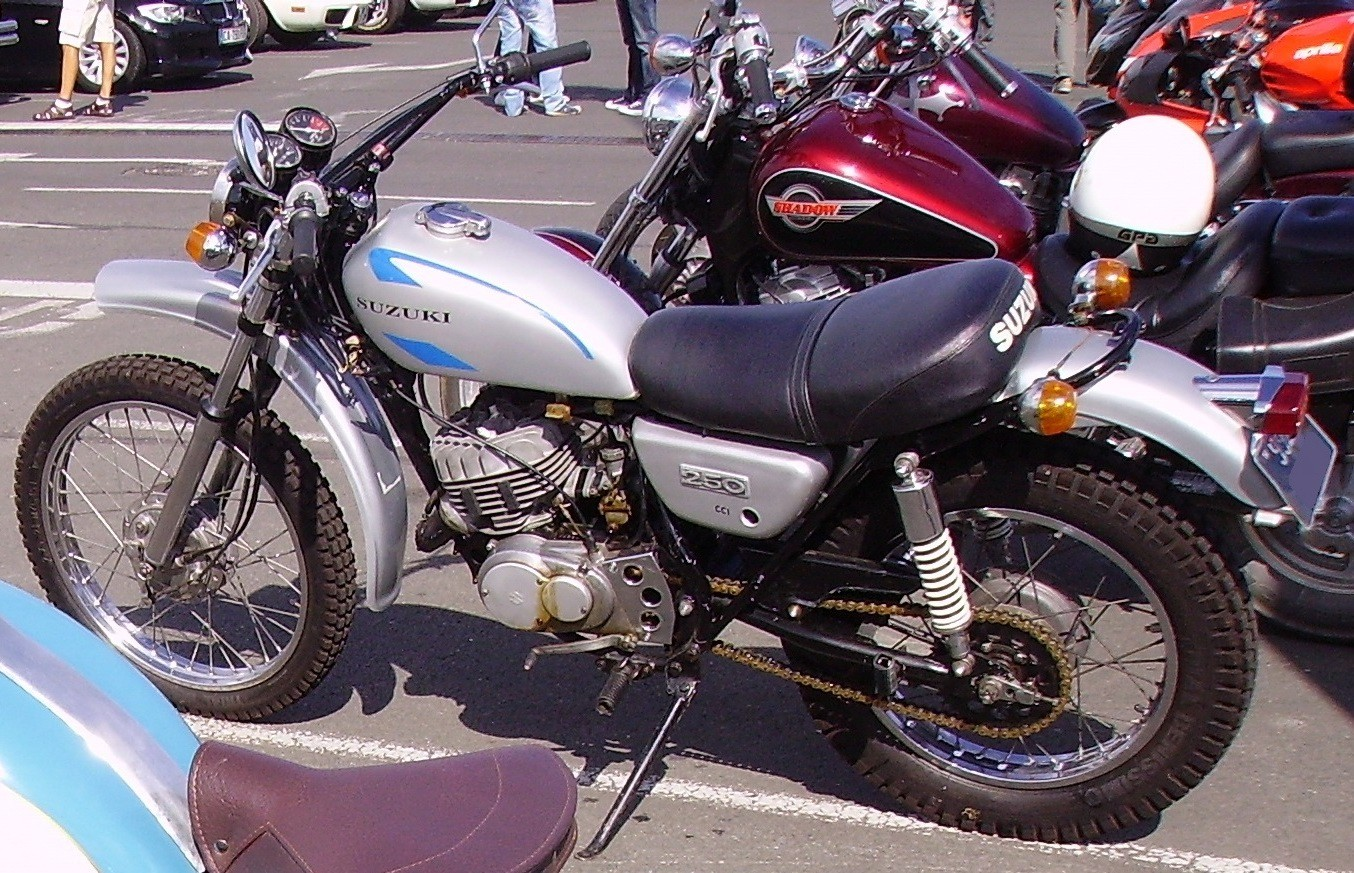
Suzuki TS250

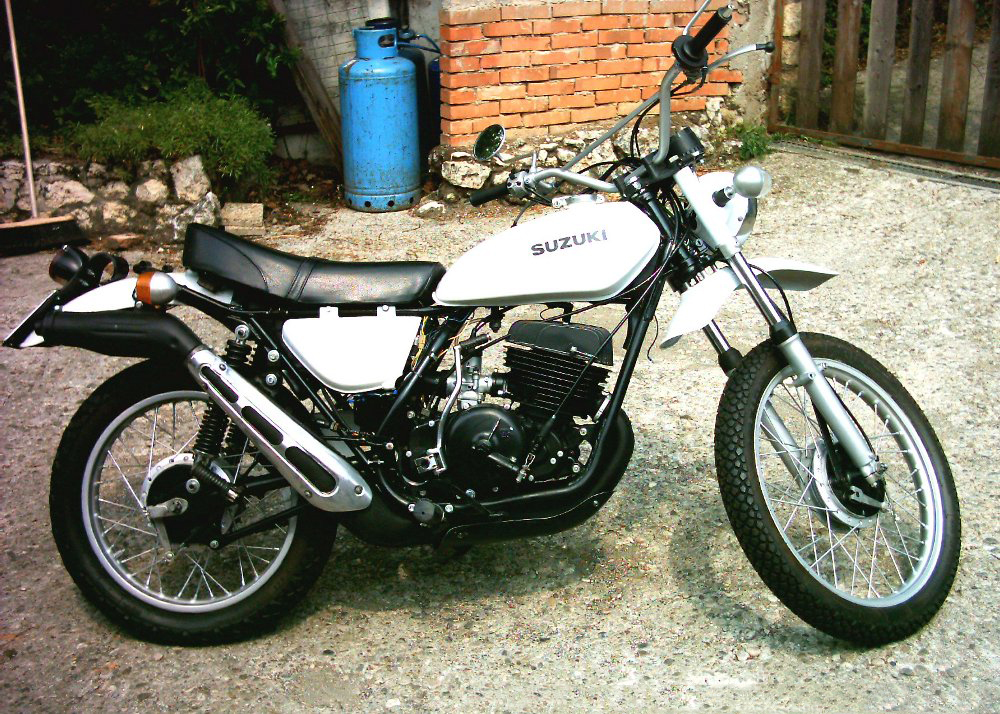
1977 Suzuki TS400

The TS185 is lighter than the 125 by a few pounds, and has nearly the power of the 250 but with a much more free revving motor. The 250 is 62 lb (28 kg) heavier than the 185. The larger TS series, 125 and over had piston port engines while the smaller TS series-90 and 100 had rotary valve induction, until the introduction of the ER series motors. With the only major redesign of the motors of this series, the new range shifted to a combined reed-valve and piston port type.

A factory race kit was available for the TS90 which consisted of an expansion chamber, light piston and rings, carburetor, and harder (colder range) plug and head which increased the size to 100 cc (6.1 cu in). In the North American market a 175cc race kit was available for the TS185. The 175 size was to match an established class. It consisted of an expansion chamber, new cylinder and head, piston, thin rings, larger carburetor, and much lower gearing. Different gearing was available for most models. The TF model (Mud Bug) was developed in the early 1970s and sold mainly in New Zealand and Australia. The TF series was made in three sizes; 100 cc, 125 cc, and 185 cc engines. These bikes were based on the ER range. The TF125 is still in production. It has left-and-right side stands with large bases, a large rear carrier, headlight and lever protection, a single seat, bash plate, large mud flaps and knobby tyres.

The very similar TC series was based on the TS series, with dual range gearboxes. The TC185 also has Dyno Starter, a DC electric combined DC generator/starter motor.

=== Model names ===
- TS50 Gaucho (1971–2009)
- TS75 (1975–1977)
- TS80 (1984–1990)
- TS90 Honcho (1970–1976)
- TS100 Blazer 1973 to 1981
- TS125 Duster (1971–2007)
- TS125R (1989–1996) liquid cooled two-stroke, 2 piece powervalves, 6 speed transmission
- TS185 Sierra (1971–2015)
- TS200R (1989–1996) 195 cc (11.9 cu in) liquid cooled two-stroke, 3 piece powervalves, 6 speed transmission
- TS250 Savage (1969–1981)
- TS250X (1985–1989) Water cooled
- TS400 Apache (1971–1979)

Model names vary by region. The 'ER' series in Britain such as the TS100ERN, the TS100ERT and TS100ERX were air-cooled twin-shock models made from 1979 to 1981 with only very minor technical and cosmetic differences between them. They were then superseded by the mono-shock TS100X model.

The TS50ER model was the predecessor to the later TS50X which ended production in 2000.

=== Transmissions ===
Wet clutch pack, with sequential manual.

TS250 pre-1973 a 4-speed synchromesh with Hi/Lo range

TS250 post-1973 a 5-speed synchromesh

TS185: 5-speed

TS90: 5-speed

TS100: regular 5-speed

TS75: 4-speed

TS50: 5-speed (later with 6)
