= Suzuki TS125 =

1981 Suzuki TS125
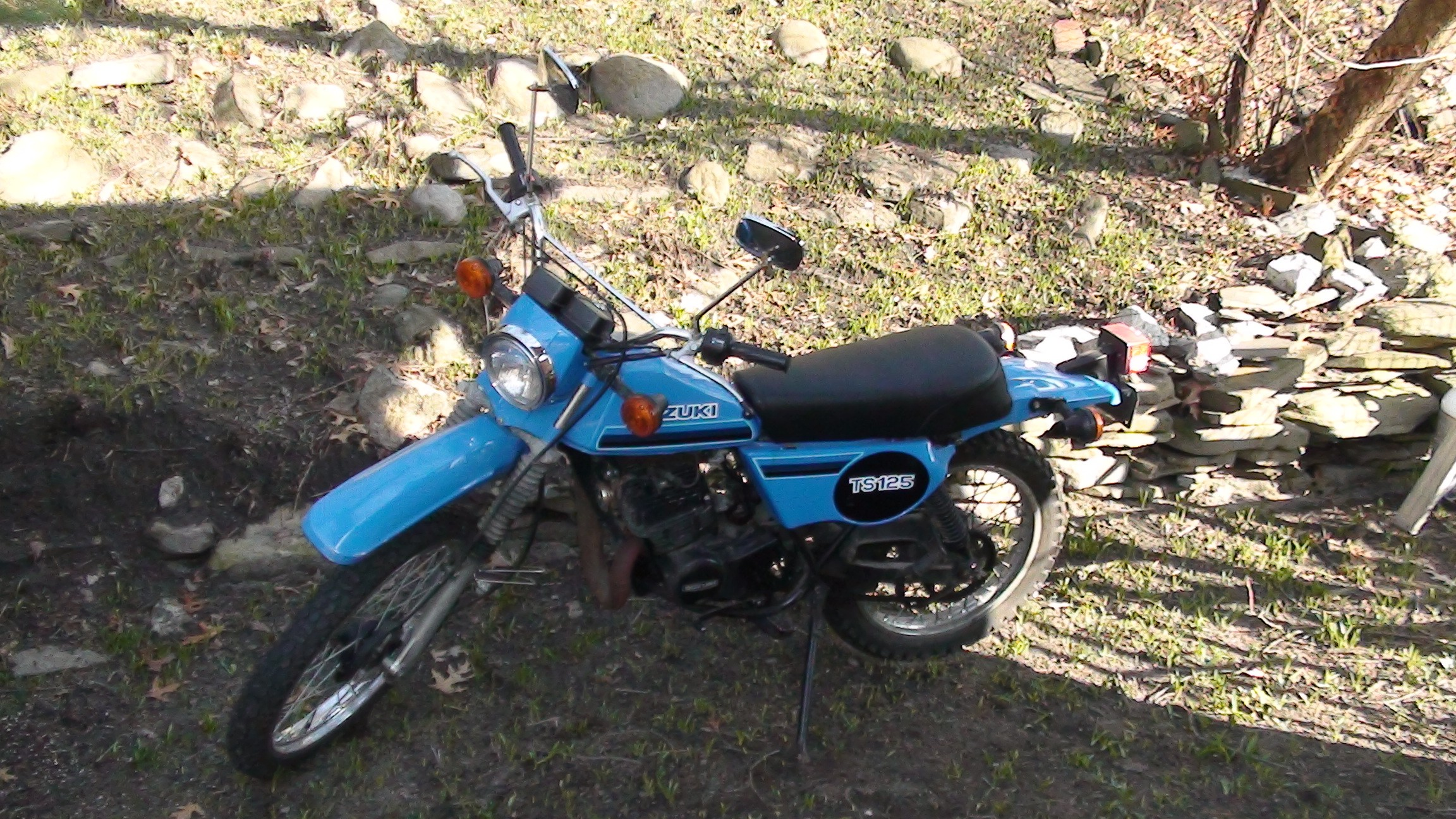
- Manufacturer: Suzuki Motor Co., Ltd.
- Class: dual-sport
- Engine: 123 cm³ (7.5 cu. in) 2-stroke cycle, air-cooled
- Transmission: 5-speed, 6-speed, constant mesh
- Wheelbase: 1,350 mm (53.1 in)
- Dimensions: L: 2,120 mm (83.5 in); W: 800 mm (31.5 in); H: 1,135 mm (44.7 in)
- Weight: 97.0 kg (214. lbs) (dry)
- Fuel capacity: 7.0 L (1.8/1.5 US/Imp gal)
- Related: Suzuki TS series

The 1981 Suzuki TS125 Dual Sport motorcycle is powered by a 123 cc 2-stroke cycle, air-cooled engine.

The TS125 was introduced for the Japanese home market in December 1970. It had 13 bhp, five speeds and high-drawn exhaust pipe. It also had a sister model, a trail version called TC-125 (Prospector in USA) with dual-range gearbox with eight speeds, luggage rack and higher mounted front mud guard that made the bike more suitable for terrain. The TC trail series were built from 90 to 250 cc but the whole model series was discontinued in the seventies.

== Specifications ==
DIMENSIONS AND DRY MASS
Overall length: 2,120 mm (83.5 in.)
Overall width: 800 mm (31.5 in.)
Overall height: 1,135 mm (44.7 in)
Wheelbase: 1,350 mm (53.1 in.)
Ground clearance: 250 mm (9.8 in.)
Dry mass: 97 kg (214 lbs)

ENGINE
Type: 2-stroke cycle, air-cooled
Intake System: Piston Ported
Number of cylinder: 1
Bore: 56.0 mm (2.205 in.)
Stroke: 50.0 mm (1.969 in.)
Piston Displacement: 123 cm^{3} (7.5 cu. in.)
Corrected compression ratio: 6.6 : 1
Carburetor: VM24SH
Air cleaner: Polyurethane foam element
Starter system: Primary Kick
Lubrication system: SUZUKI "CCI"

TRANSMISSION SYSTEM
Clutch: Wet multi-plate type
Transmission: 6-speed, constant mesh
5-speed earlier models e.g. TS 125A. Gearshift pattern: 1-down 5-up
1-down 4-up earlier. Primary reduction: 3.562 (57/16)
Final reduction ratio: 3.066 (46/15)
Gear ratios, low: 3.090 (34/11)
2nd : 2.000 (30/15)
3rd : 1.368 (26/19)
4th : 1.095 (23/21)
5th : 0.956 (22/23)
Top : 0.840 (21/25)
Drive chain: DAIDO #428D, 116 links

CHASSIS
Front suspension: Telescopic, oil damped
Rear suspension: Swinging arm, oil dampened, spring 5-way adjustable
Steering angle: 40° (right and left)
Caster: 60°00'
Trail: 147 mm (5.79 in.)
Turning radius: 2.4 m (7.9 ft)
Front brake: Internal Expanding
Rear brake: Internal Expanding
Front tire size: 2.75-21 4PR
Rear tire size: 4.10-18 4PR

ELECTRICAL SYSTEM Ignition type: SUZUKI "PEI"
Ignition timing: 20°B.T.D.C. at 6,000 r/min
Spark plug: NGK B8ES or NIPPON DENSO W24ES
Battery: 6V 14.4kC (4Ah) 10HR
Fuse: 10A
Headlight: 6V 30/30W
Tail/Brake light: 6V 5.3/25W
Turn signal light: 6V 17W
Speedometer light: 6V 3W
Neutral indicator light: 6V 3W
High beam indicator light: 6V 1.7W
Turn signal indicator light: 6V 3W

CAPACITIES
Fuel tank, including reserve: 7.0 L (1.8/1.5 US/lmp gal)
reserve : 1.5 L (1.6/1.3 US/lmp qt)
Engine oil: 1.2 L (1.3/1.1 US/lmp qt)
Transmission oil: 700 ml (1.5/1.2 US/lmp pt)
