= Suzuki Burgman =

Type of motorcycle

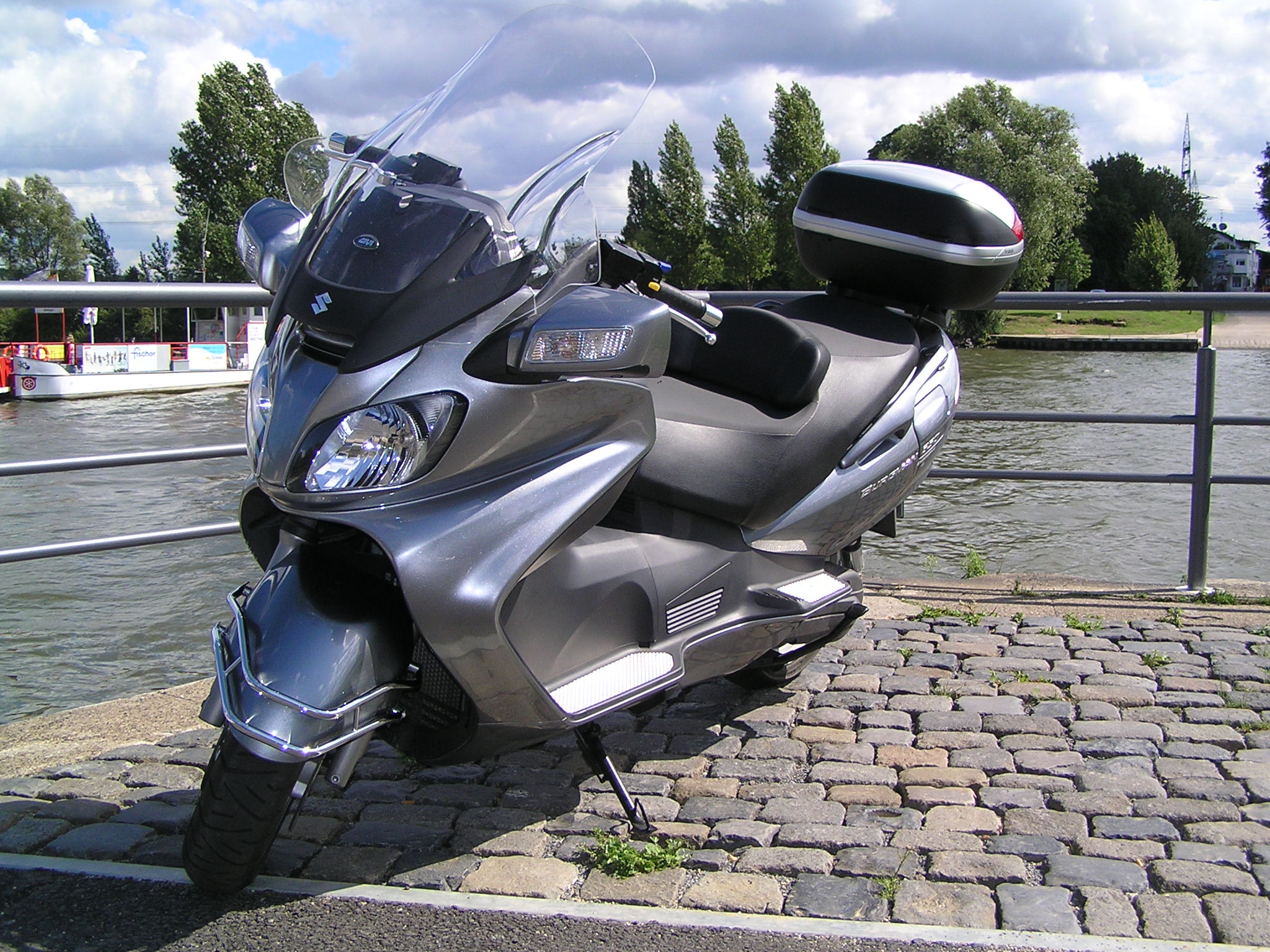
- Burgman 650
- Manufacturer: Suzuki
- Also called: Suzuki Skywave (Japan); Suzuki Burgman Street (UB125)
- Production: 1998-present
- Class: Maxi scooter
- Engine: 125–638 cc
- Transmission: V-belt (400); CVT (650)
- Seat height: 28 to 29.5 inches (710–750 mm)
- Weight: Burgman Street 125: 110 kg (240 lb); Burgman 125: 159 kg (351 lb); Burgman 400: 222 kg (489 lb); Burgman 650: 238 kg (525 lb) (dry)
- Fuel capacity: 11 L (2.4 imp gal; 2.9 US gal) to 15 L (3.3 imp gal; 4.0 US gal)

The Burgman series of scooters (known in Japan as Skywave) is produced by Suzuki with engine capacities from 125 cc up to 638 cc.

== AN series ==
Launched in 1998, the original model line-up consisted of the AN250 and AN400Y models. In 2002 the AN250 was dropped, replaced by the European-legislation compliant for learner-license purposes UH125. However, the AN250 continued to be released in other countries. The UH prefix was used on this model due to a current model of non Burgman heritage still being produced. This is the AN125 and bears no resemblance nor lineage with the Burgman series.

== AN2 series ==
In 2002, the fuel injected AN2 series was launched in UH125, AN400 and AN650 (L2) variants. With a redesigned fairing package allowing for better lighting, more storage capacity and 1 litre more fuel capacity, there was also the option for ABS on the AN400 and AN650 models. The AN400 was available in US markets in 2002 and the following year the AN650 (L3) came to the US. Changes to the eCVT and computer on the AN650 (L5) in 2005.

In 2004, Suzuki launched an up-market AN650A Executive (non-US), which involved a full ABS and accessories package.

The Burgman 400 has had a few models. In 2005 or 2006, the Burgman 400S became available, featured chrome handle bars, a lower sport-bike like windshield, and white and red gauges. In 2007 the 400 was updated from a 13" to a 14" front wheel, dual disc brakes in the front. In 2018 the Burgman 400 was totally redesigned.

== Models ==
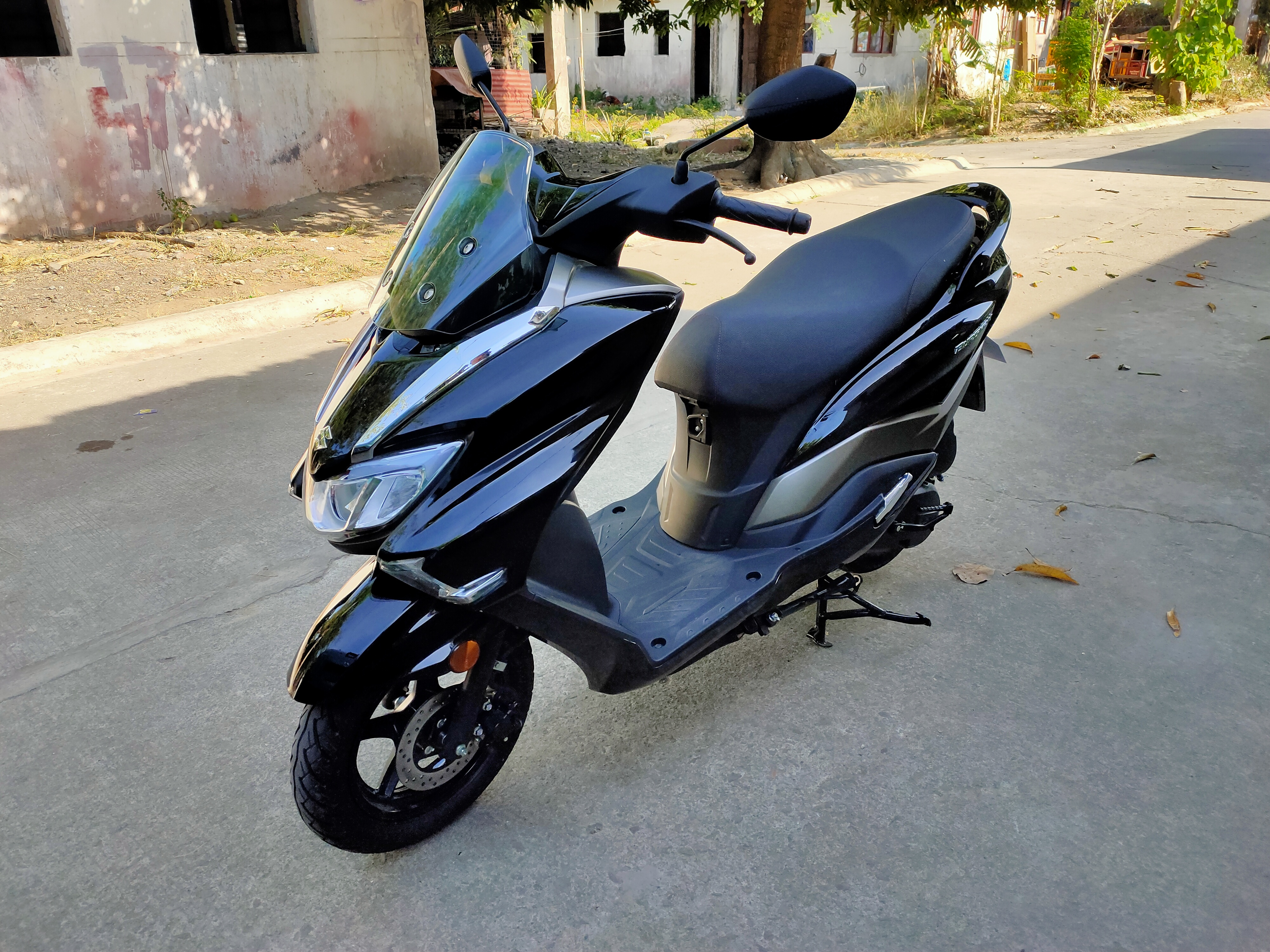
Sample photo of Suzuki Burgman Street 125.

- UH125 Burgman 125 (2002–present) - often mistakenly identified as AN125 (an earlier Suzuki model which shares none of the Burgman traits). Whereas a Burgman UH125 is classed as a maxi-scooter, AN125 is a scooter. Suzuki Burgman is one of the fastest motorbikes regarding 125 cc and is quite comfortable.
- UB125 Burgman Street 125 (2018–present) - a Burgman maxi-scooter family built in India based on Suzuki Access, completely different and smaller than UH125. There is also a variant named Burgman Street 125 EX (shorten for Executive Class), is a slight upgrade over the standard Burgman Street 125 and was introduced. It has a few key differences, including: 12-inch front and rear wheels: The EX has 12-inch wheels front and rear, while the standard Burgman Street has 12-inch wheels front and 10-inch wheels rear. This gives the EX a slightly larger footprint and better handling; Disc brake on the rear wheel: The EX has a disc brake on the rear wheel, while the standard Burgman Street has a drum brake. This gives the EX slightly better braking performance; Chrome accents: The EX has chrome accents on the front fender, headlight cowl, and side panels. These give the EX a more premium look and; New color options: The EX is available in two new color options: Pearl Mirage White and Metallic Matte Black. Other than these differences, the Suzuki Burgman Street 125 EX and the standard Burgman Street 125 are very similar. They both have the same 125cc engine, fuel economy, and features.
- UH150 Burgman 150 (2002–2006) - is a scooter is powered by a 152cc, single-cylinder, air-cooled engine that produces 11 horsepower and 11 Nm of torque. It has a top speed of 95 kmph and a fuel economy of 35 kmpl. The scooter is equipped with a number of features, including a front disc brake, rear drum brake, alloy wheels, and a digital instrument cluster.
- UH200 Burgman 200 (2007–present) - is powered by a fuel-injected, single-cylinder, liquid-cooled engine that produces 18.1 horsepower and 12.5 lb-ft of torque. The Burgman 200 has a top speed of 75 mph and gets an estimated 53 mpg. It has a spacious under-seat storage compartment that can hold a full-face helmet, and it also has a glovebox and a small storage compartment in the front. The Burgman 200 comes standard with ABS brakes.
- AN250 Burgman 250 (1998–2017) - is a 249cc scooter. It was first introduced in 1998 and is still in production today. The Burgman 250 is a popular choice for commuters and touring riders thanks to its comfortable riding position, large fuel tank, and spacious storage compartments. The AN250 Burgman 250 is available in a variety of colors, including pearl white, black, and silver.
- AN400 Burgman 400 (1999–present) - is a mid-sized maxi scooter. It was first introduced in 1998 and has been in continuous production ever since. The Burgman 400 is powered by a 399cc, liquid-cooled, single-cylinder engine that produces 30.5 horsepower and 26.5 lb-ft of torque. It has a top speed of around 110 mph and gets an average of 67 mpg. The Burgman 400 is known for its comfortable ride and spacious storage compartments. It has a large underseat storage area that can fit two full-face helmets, as well as a glovebox and a 12-volt power outlet. The Burgman 400 is also equipped with a number of features that make it a safe and practical scooter, including ABS brakes, a center stand, and a large headlight. The Burgman 400 is a popular choice for both commuting and touring. It is comfortable enough to ride for long distances, yet it is still maneuverable enough to use in city traffic. The Burgman 400 is also a good choice for riders who want a scooter with a lot of storage space.
  - AN400 Burgman 400 ABS - is a large-displacement scooter. It is powered by a 400cc, liquid-cooled, single-cylinder engine that is paired with a CVT automatic transmission. The Burgman 400 ABS has a comfortable riding position and a large underseat storage compartment. It also comes standard with ABS, which provides added safety.
- AN650 Burgman 650 - is a maxi-scooter that was produced from 2003 to 2018. It is powered by a 638cc parallel-twin engine that produces 54 horsepower and 46 lb-ft of torque. The Burgman 650 is equipped with a continuously variable transmission (CVT) and can reach a top speed of 110 mph. The Burgman 650 is known for its comfort and practicality. It has a large underseat storage compartment that can hold two full-face helmets, as well as two front compartments. The scooter also has a spacious seat and floorboards, making it comfortable for both the rider and passenger.
  - AN650A Burgman 650 Executive - this package typically adds ABS, an electric adjustable windshield, electric adjustable folding mirrors, passenger backrest, chrome bar ends and chrome muffler cover. In Canada and Europe, heated hand grips and heated seats are also part of the Executive package.

== Experimentals and limited editions ==
Suzuki has made a hydrogen fuel cell-electric hybrid scooter called the Suzuki Burgman fuel cell scooter. It received "whole vehicle type" approval in the EU.
