= Mitsubishi 3A9 engine =

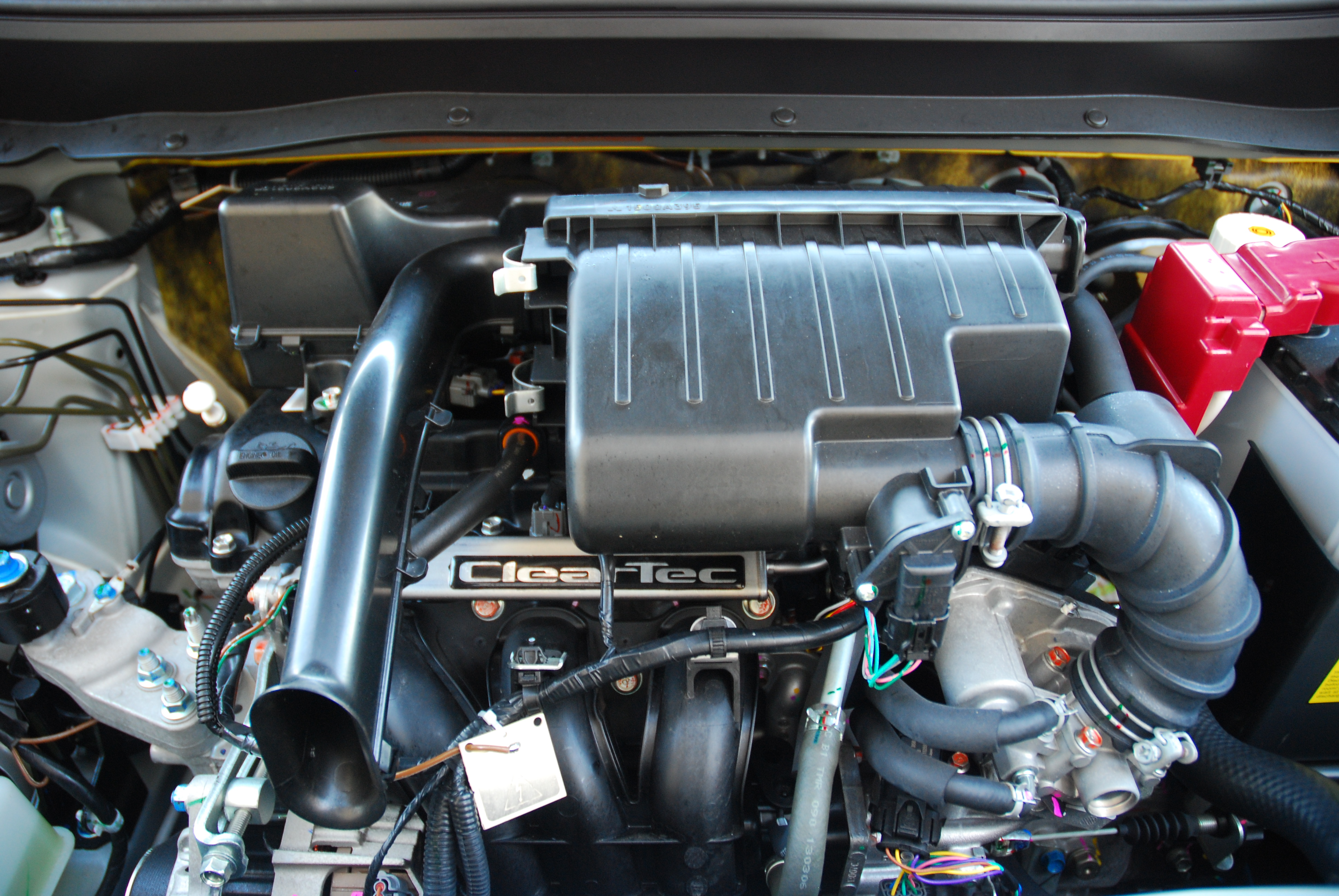
- Mitsubishi 3A90 1.0 Mivec Engine (2013 Spacestar)

Overview
- Manufacturer: MDC Power
- Production: 2003–present

Layout
- Configuration: Naturally aspirated Straight-3
- Displacement: 1.0 L (999 cc); 1.1 L (1,124 cc); 1.2 L (1,193 cc)
- Cylinder bore: 75 mm (2.95 in)
- Piston stroke: 75.4 mm (2.97 in); 84.8 mm (3.34 in); 90 mm (3.54 in)
- Cylinder block material: Aluminum
- Cylinder head material: Aluminum
- Valvetrain: DOHC 4 valves x cyl. with MIVEC
- Compression ratio: 10.5:1

Combustion
- Fuel system: Fuel injection
- Fuel type: Unleaded regular gasoline, Gasohol E10, E20
- Cooling system: Water-cooled

Output
- Power output: 52–57 kW (71–77 PS; 70–76 bhp)
- Torque output: 88–100 N⋅m (65–74 lb⋅ft)

The Mitsubishi 3A9 engine is a range of all-alloy three cylinder engines from Mitsubishi Motors that were jointly developed with 4A9 engine family. They were introduced in the 2003 version of their Mitsubishi Colt supermini, and built by DaimlerChrysler-owned MDC Power in Germany (previously a joint venture).

For engine family characteristics see 4A9 engine family.

== Specifications ==
=== 3A90 ===
Displacement	1.0 L (999 cc)
Bore pitch	83 mm (3.27 in)
Bore x stroke	75 mm × 75.4 mm (2.95 in × 2.97 in)
Peak power	52 kW (71 PS; 70 hp) at 6,000 rpm
Peak torque	88 N⋅m (65 lb⋅ft) at 5,000 rpm
Notes	MIVEC

=== Applications ===
- 2012-2022 Mitsubishi Mirage
- 2013-2020 Mitsubishi Attrage

=== 3A91 ===
Also known as the Mercedes-Benz M134 E11.

Displacement	1.1 L (1,124 cc)
Bore pitch	83 mm (3.27 in)
Bore x stroke	75 mm × 84.8 mm (2.95 in × 3.34 in)
Peak power	55 kW (75 PS; 74 hp) at 6,000 rpm
Peak torque	100 N⋅m (74 lb⋅ft) at 3,500 rpm
Notes	-

=== Applications ===
- 2004-2012 Mitsubishi Colt
- 2004-2006 MCC Smart Forfour

=== 3A92 ===
Displacement	1.2 L (1,193 cc)
Bore pitch	83 mm (3.27 in)
Bore x stroke	75 mm × 90 mm (2.95 in × 3.54 in)
Peak power	57 kW (77 PS; 76 hp) at 6,000 rpm
Peak torque	100 N⋅m (74 lb⋅ft) at 4,000 rpm
Notes	MIVEC, gasohol E10, E20

=== Applications ===
- 2012-2024 Mitsubishi Mirage
- 2013 Mitsubishi Attrage

== See also ==
- List of Mitsubishi engines
