= Mitsubishi ASX =

Subcompact crossover SUV

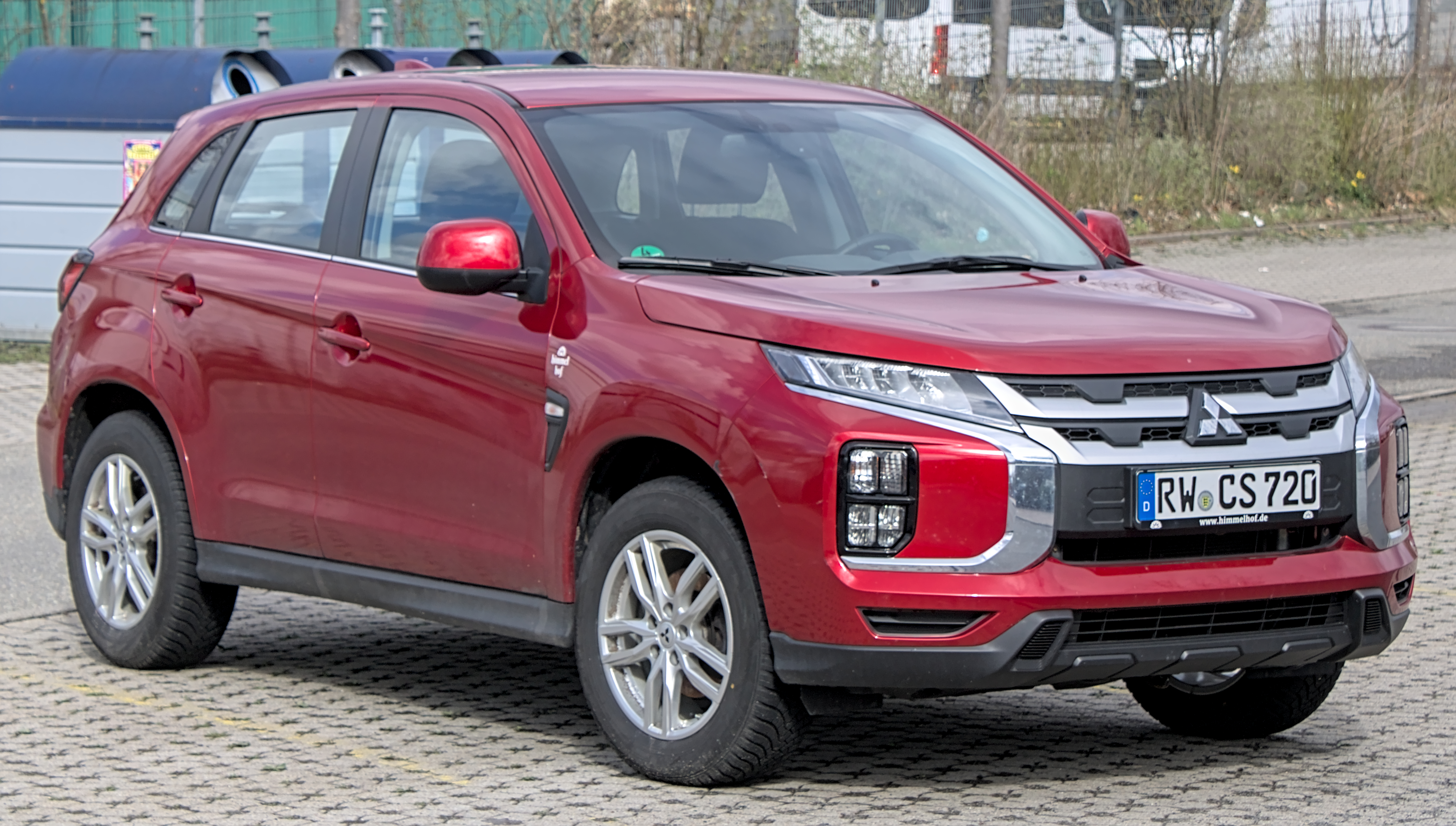
- 2019 Mitsubishi ASX

Overview
- Manufacturer: Mitsubishi Motors (first generation); Renault (second generation)
- Production: 2010–present

Body and chassis
- Class: Subcompact crossover SUV
- Body style: 5-door SUV

Chronology
- Predecessor: Mitsubishi Pajero iO; Mitsubishi RVR (second generation) (for RVR nameplate)

The Mitsubishi ASX (abbreviation of "Active Sports Crossover") is a subcompact crossover SUV manufactured by the Japanese automaker Mitsubishi Motors. On introduction, it was positioned below the Outlander in Mitsubishi's crossover SUV line-up, until the Eclipse Cross filled the gap between the ASX and Outlander in 2017. It was built on the GS platform closely shared with the Lancer and Outlander.

For the European market, the second-generation ASX is a rebadged Renault Captur, which was sold from March 2023.

== First generation (GA; 2010) ==
First generation
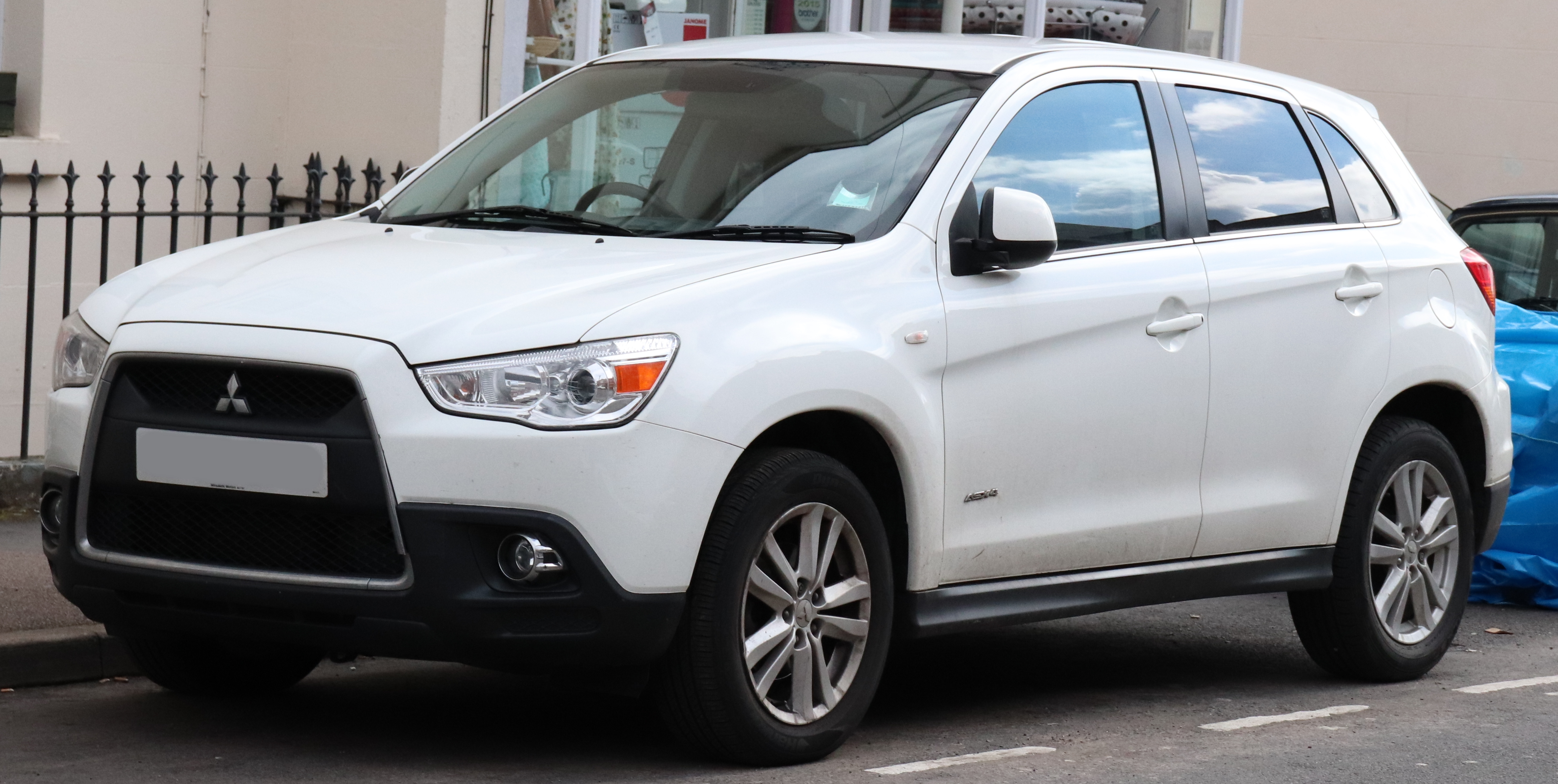

Overview
- Model code: GA; XA; XB; XC; XD
- Also called: Mitsubishi RVR; Mitsubishi Outlander Sport; Peugeot 4008 (2012–2017); Citroën C4 Aircross (2012–2017)
- Production: 2010–present
- Model years: 2011–present
- Assembly: Japan: Okazaki, Aichi (Okazaki Plant, until 2017); Kurashiki, Okayama (Mizushima Plant, since 2017); Brazil: Catalão (HPE Automotores, until 2022); China: Changsha, Hunan (GMMC, until 2023); Indonesia: East Jakarta (KRM, until 2018); Malaysia: Kuala Lumpur (TCMA, until 2021); United States: Normal, Illinois (MMNA, until 2015)
- Designer: Norihiko Yoshihime

Body and chassis
- Layout: Front-engine, front-wheel-drive; Front-engine, all-wheel-drive
- Platform: Mitsubishi GS platform
- Related: Mitsubishi Outlander (third generation); Mitsubishi Eclipse Cross; Mitsubishi Lancer (ninth generation); Jeep Compass (first generation); Jeep Patriot; Dodge Caliber

Powertrain
- Engine: Petrol: 1.6 L 4A92 I4; 1.8 L 4B10 I4; 1.8 L 4J10 I4; 2.0 L 4B11 I4; 2.0 L 4J11 I4; 2.4 L 4B12 I4; Diesel: 1.6 L PSA DV6C turbo I4; 1.8 L 4N13 turbo I4; 2.2 L 4N14 turbo I4
- Transmission: 5/6-speed manual; 6-speed automatic; 6-speed INVECS-III CVT

Dimensions
- Wheelbase: 2,670 mm (105.1 in)
- Length: 4,295–4,366 mm (169.1–171.9 in)
- Width: 1,770–1,810 mm (69.7–71.3 in)
- Height: 1,625–1,641 mm (64.0–64.6 in)

Chronology
- Successor: Mitsubishi Xforce (emerging markets)

The first-generation ASX was first released in the Japanese domestic market on 17 February 2010 as the Mitsubishi RVR. The RVR nameplate is only used in Japan, South Korea, and Canada. It is sold as the ASX in most markets, and also as the Mitsubishi Outlander Sport in the United States, Argentina, Brazil, and Indonesia. In Puerto Rico, it uses both the ASX and Outlander Sport titles.

The design of the ASX was previewed by the Mitsubishi Concept-cX prototype which was first exhibited at the 62nd Frankfurt Motor Show in July 2007. It is a return to the original concept of offering the platform used for the longer Outlander with reduced seating capacity to five people, while sharing components of the longer vehicle, demonstrating a corporate decision to return Mitsubishi to smaller, fuel efficient vehicles in favor of larger, truck-based products. It was also exhibited at the 40th Tokyo Motor Show in September the same year.

The European ASX was exhibited at the Geneva Motor Show in March 2010, while the North American market Outlander Sport/RVR was revealed at the 2010 New York International Auto Show. Between 2012 and 2015 production of the Outlander Sport began in Mitsubishi's Illinois plant, for both the North American and a number of export markets. As of 2022, production of the ASX continues in Japan for the global market and China for the local market.

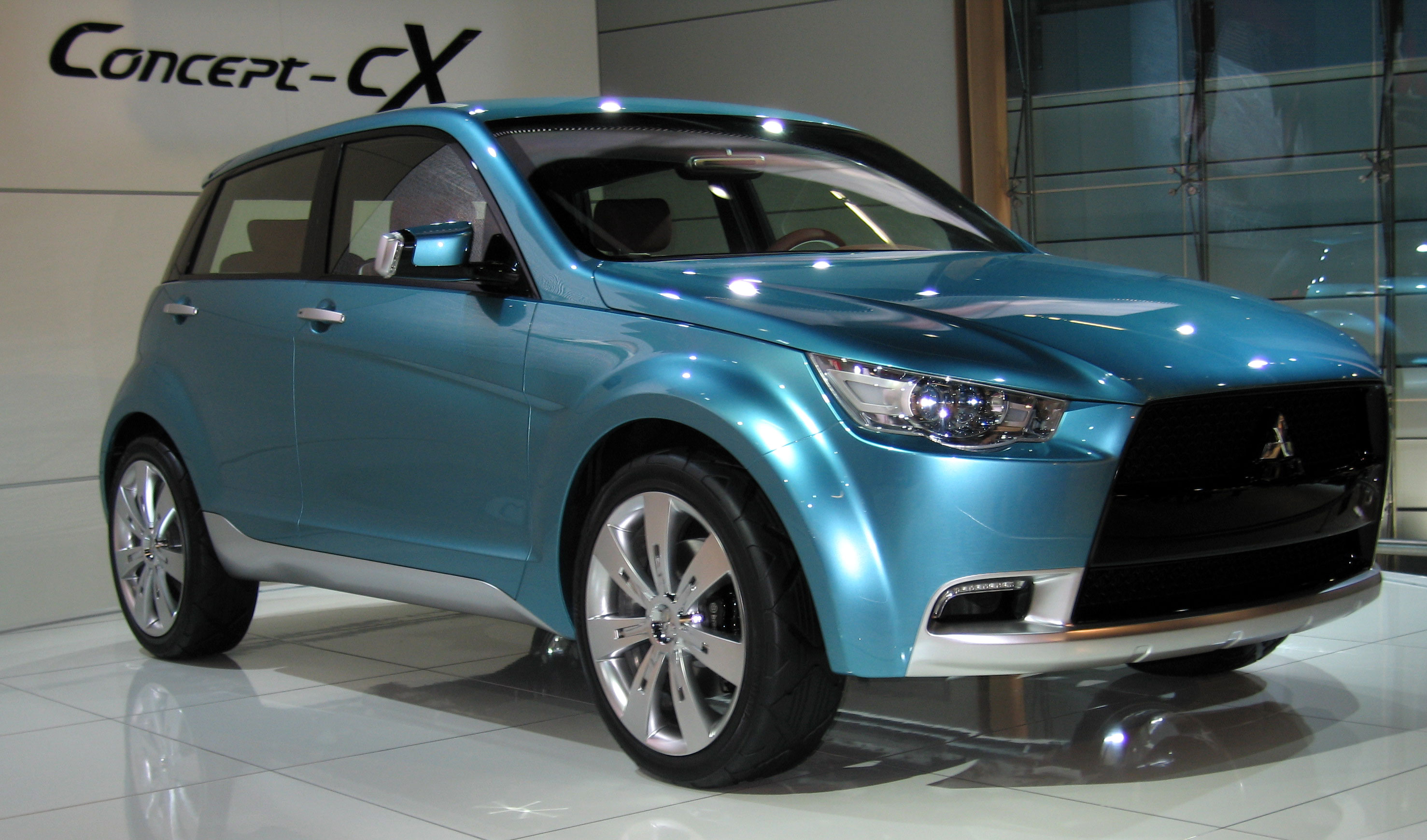
Mitsubishi Concept-cX

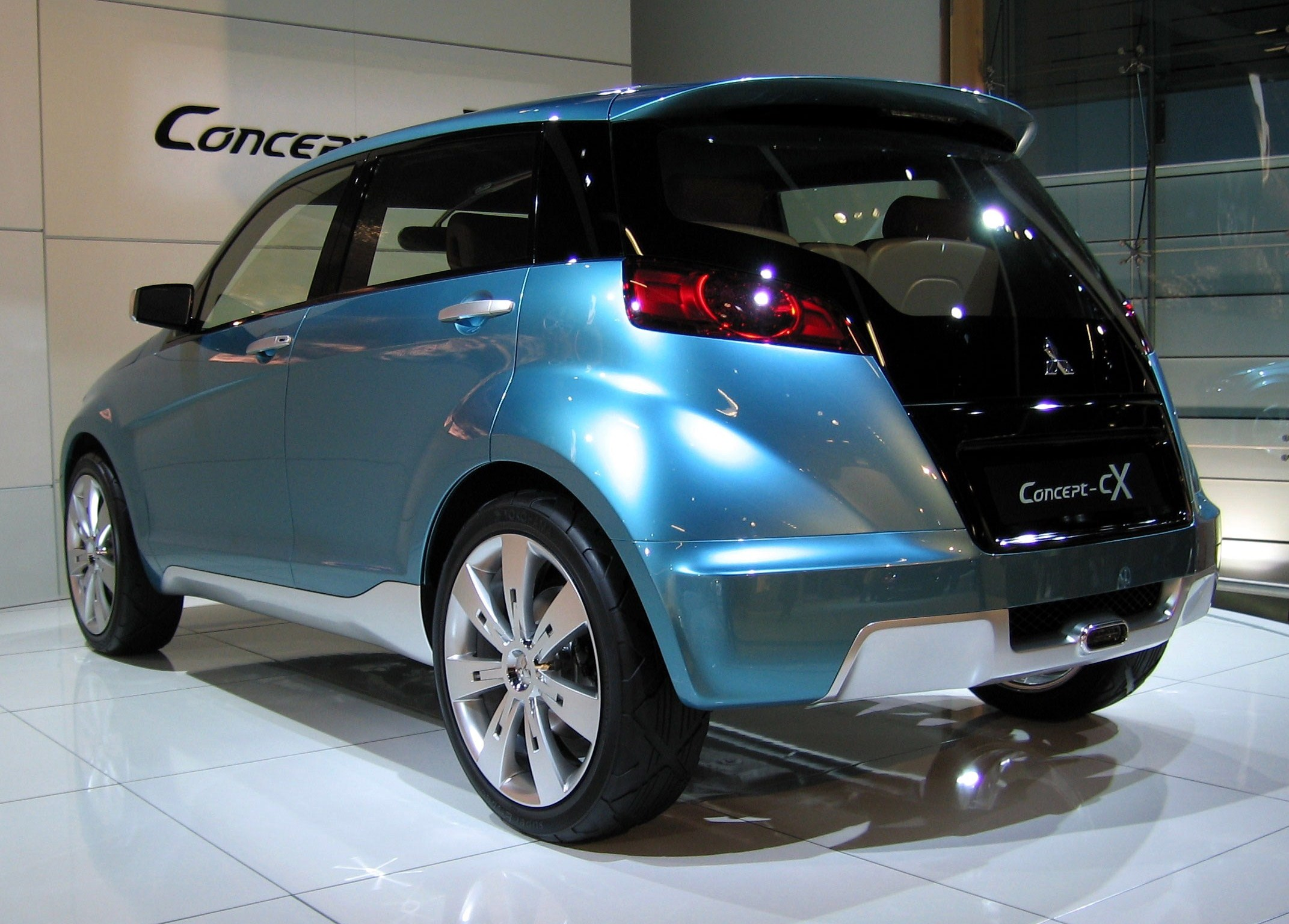
Mitsubishi Concept-cX

=== Facelifts ===
The first facelifted ASX was revealed in the United States in April 2012 with changes focusing on its front fascia by reshaping the trapezoid grille, and a redesigned rear bumper. In addition, rocker panels became grey, while roof racks disappeared.

Going on sale in mid-2014, the 2015 model introduced some visual changes: new LED daytime running lamps were featured in the front bumper, there was a new 17" alloy wheel design, and roof racks appeared once again (after being removed in the 2013 model).

Further changes occurred in mid-2015 for the "2015.5" model. 18" wheels became standard, and featured black wheel arch surrounds. A chrome tailgate finish and a new steering wheel were other changes that year.

The second facelift was released in November 2015 at the Los Angeles Auto Show, which introduced the "Dynamic Shield" front design concept and redesigned alloy wheels. This version was introduced in Europe in September 2016 at the 2016 Paris Motor Show.

A third facelift was unveiled prior to the 2019 Geneva Motor Show in February 2019. The front received an updated "Dynamic Shield" design. In many markets this was to become the 2020 model year RVR/ASX/Outlander Sport. The facelift introduces a new front fascia design, new 18" alloy wheels, and a redesigned Smartphone Display Link (SDL) infotainment system with optional Apple CarPlay and Android Auto smartphone integration, and a new eight-inch touchscreen display.

In the United States, the Outlander Sport gained a new SP trim to replace the previous LE trim. The 148-horsepower, 2.0-litre inline four-cylinder engine was standard on the ES and SE trims, while a 166-horsepower, 2.4-litre inline-four is standard on the SP and GT trims. The smaller 2.0 option was also now available with all-wheel drive (AWD) in addition to the standard front-wheel drive (FWD).

Pre-facelift

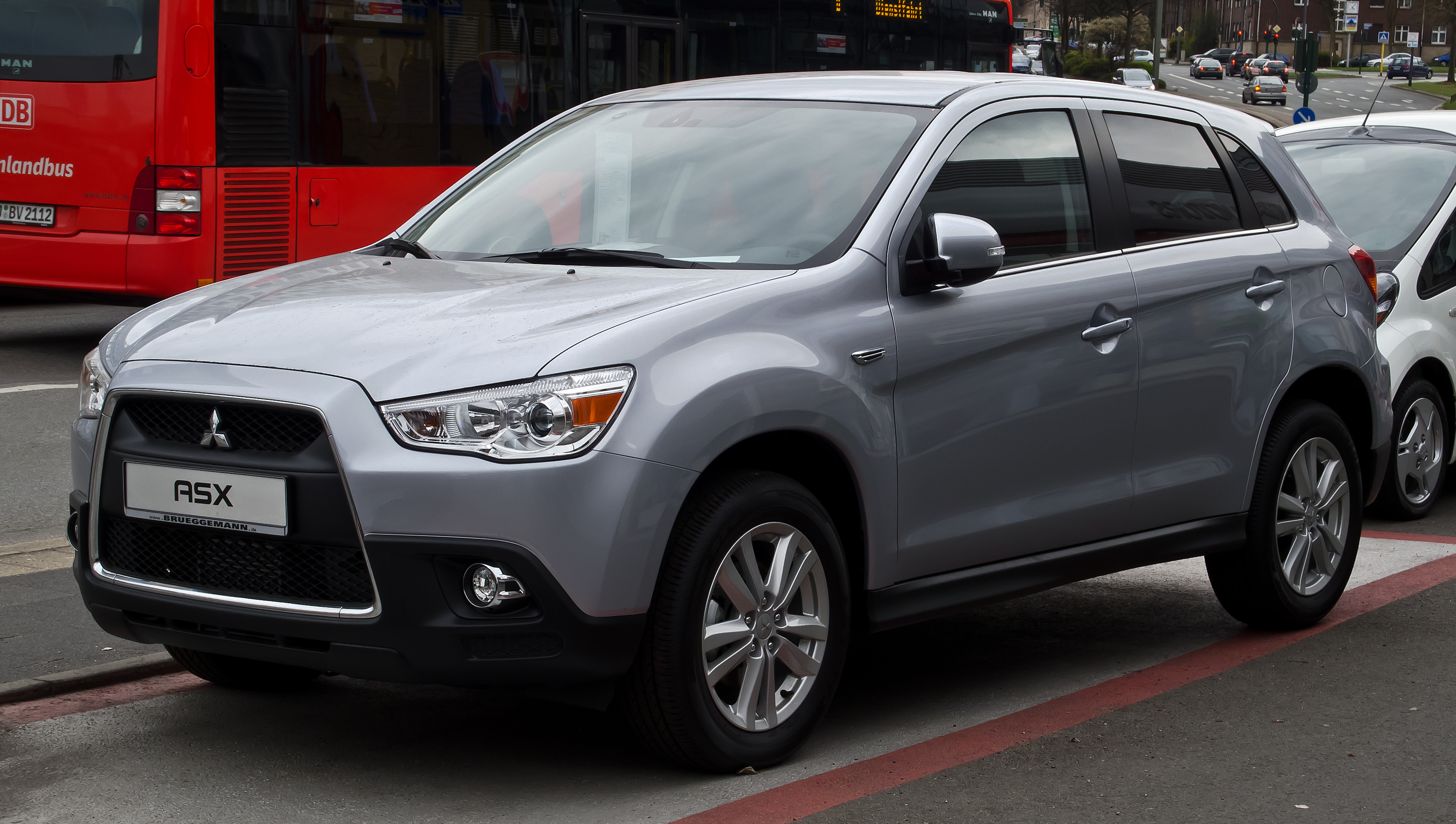
Mitsubishi ASX (pre-facelift)

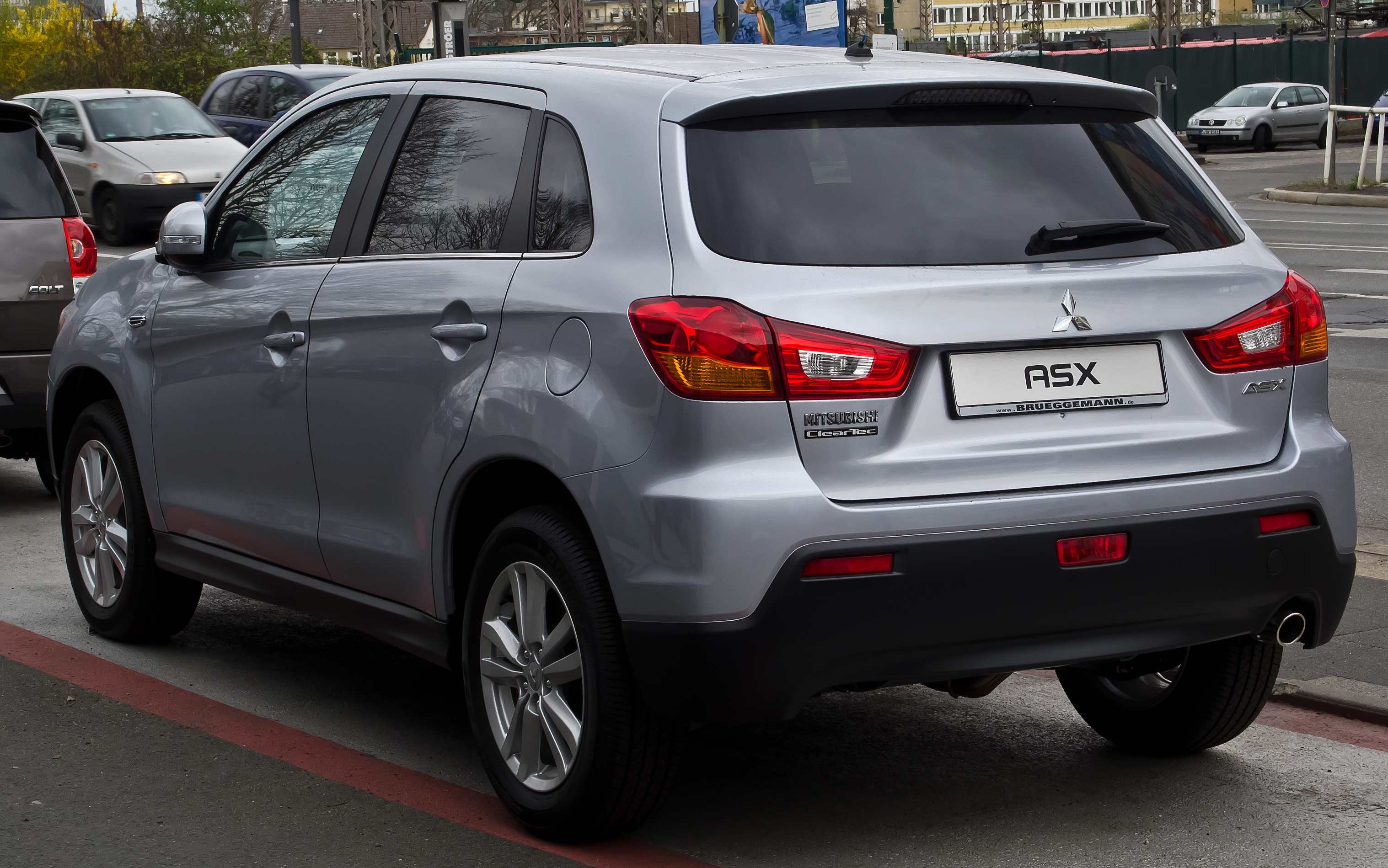
Mitsubishi ASX (pre-facelift)

First facelift

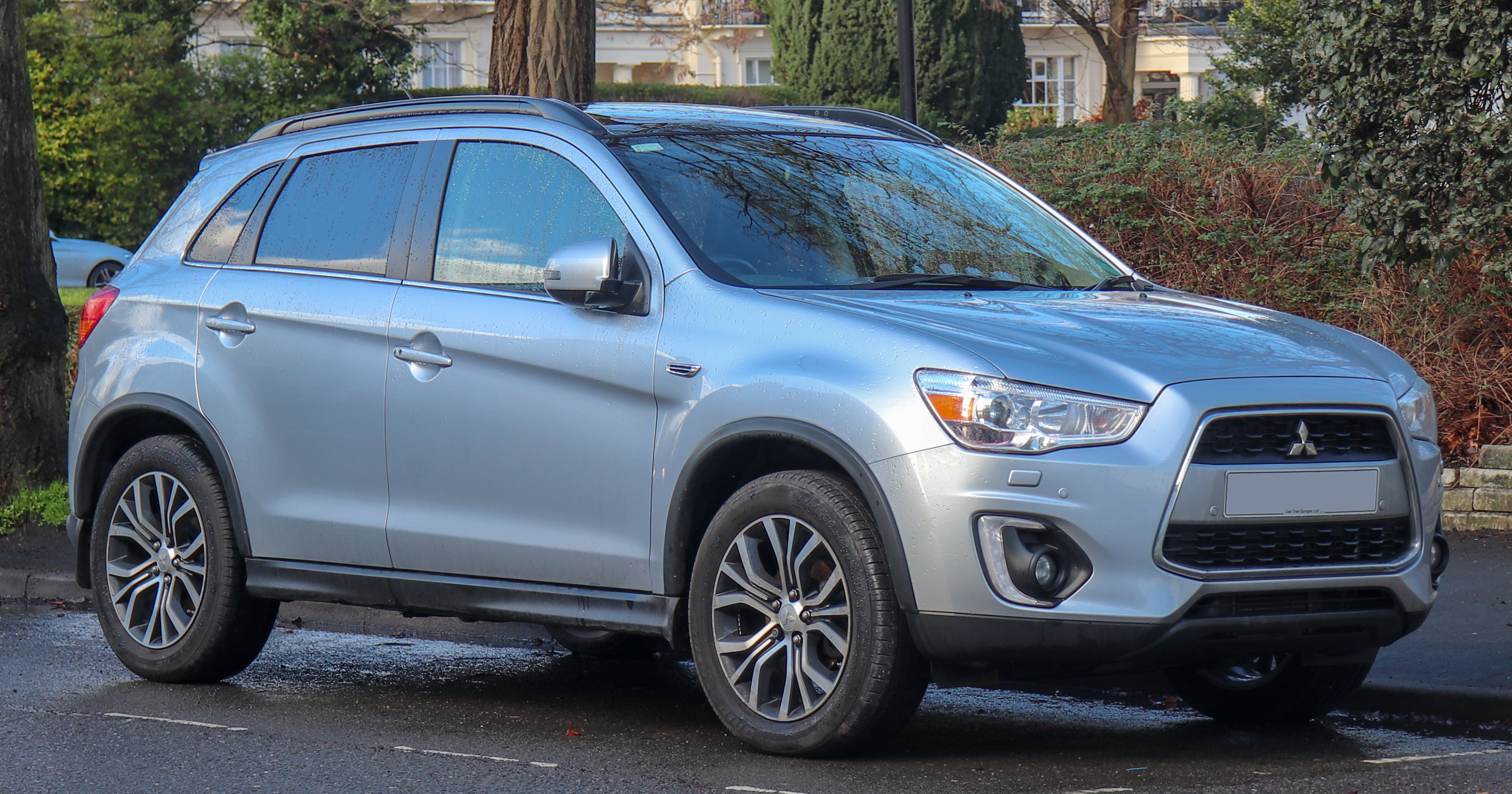
Mitsubishi ASX (first facelift)

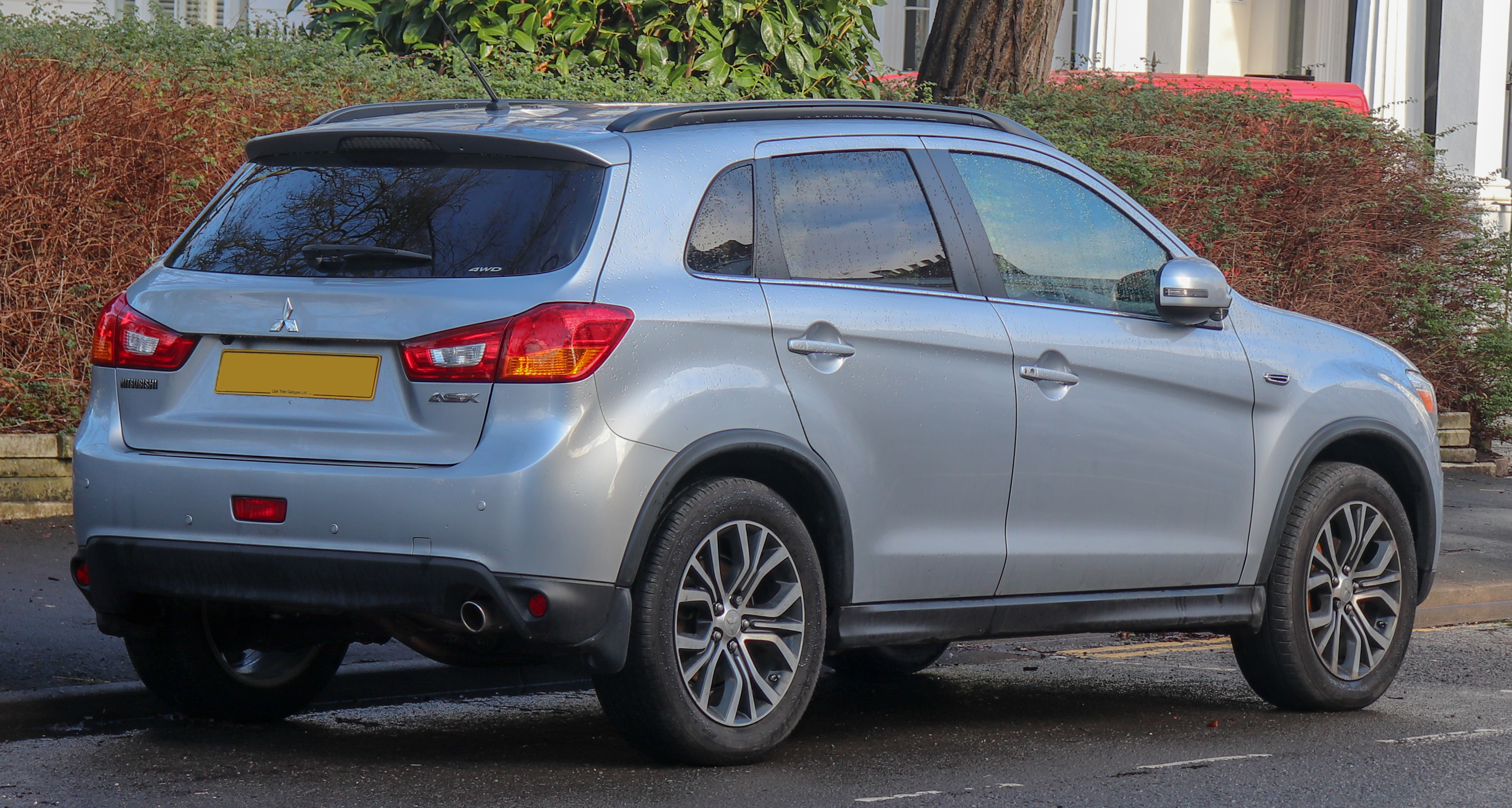
Mitsubishi ASX (first facelift)

Second facelift

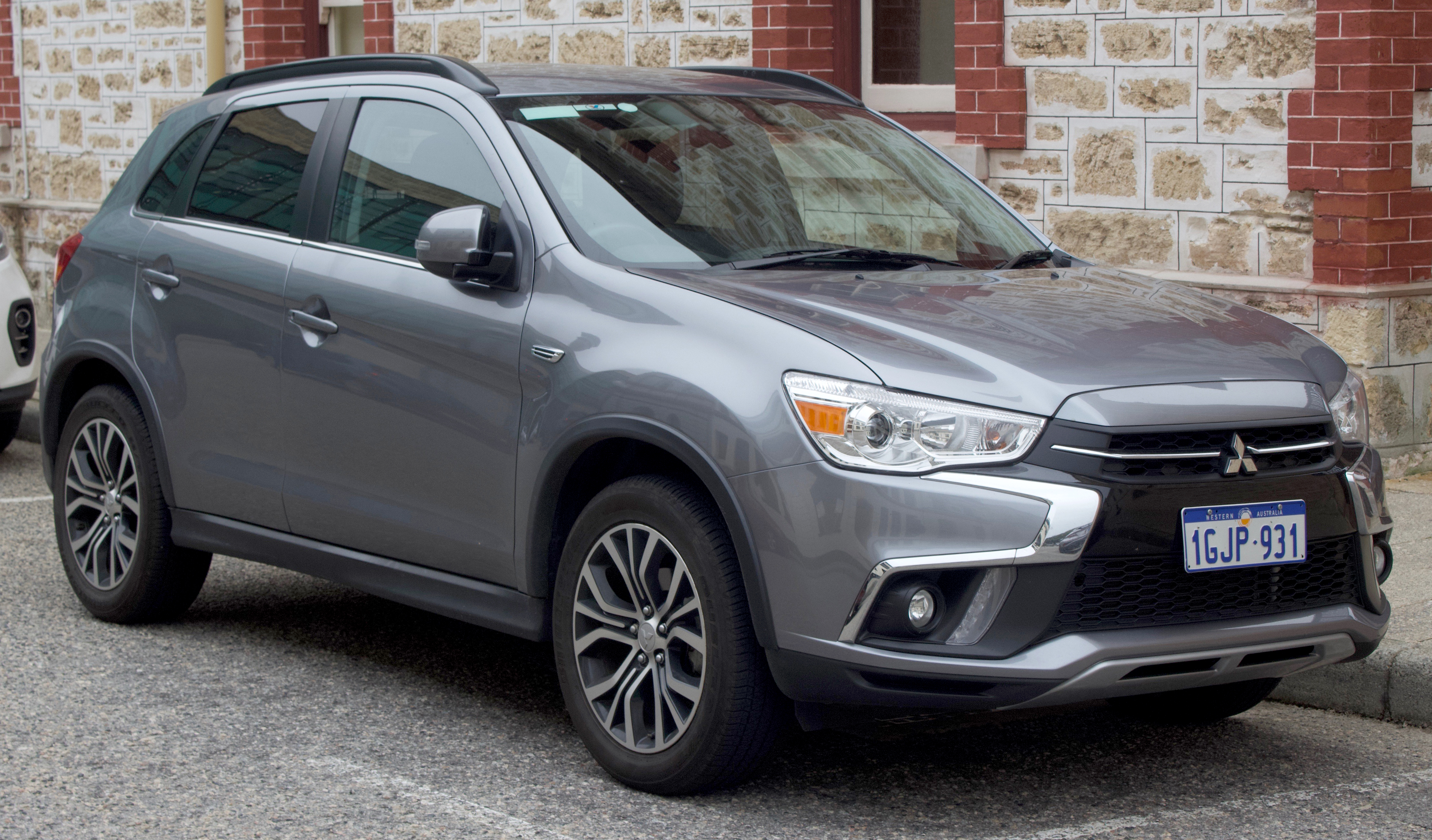
Mitsubishi ASX (second facelift)

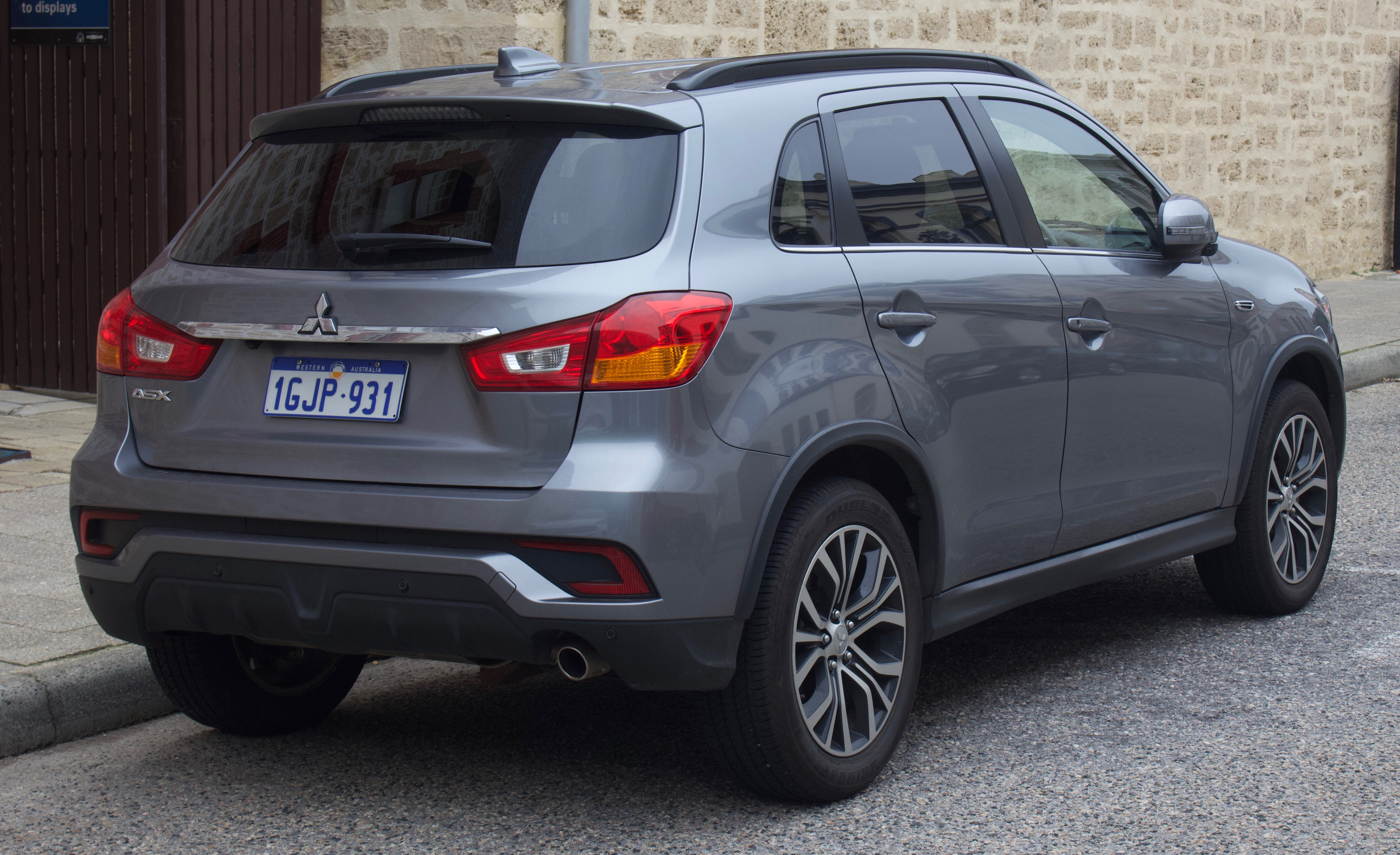
Mitsubishi ASX (second facelift)

Third facelift

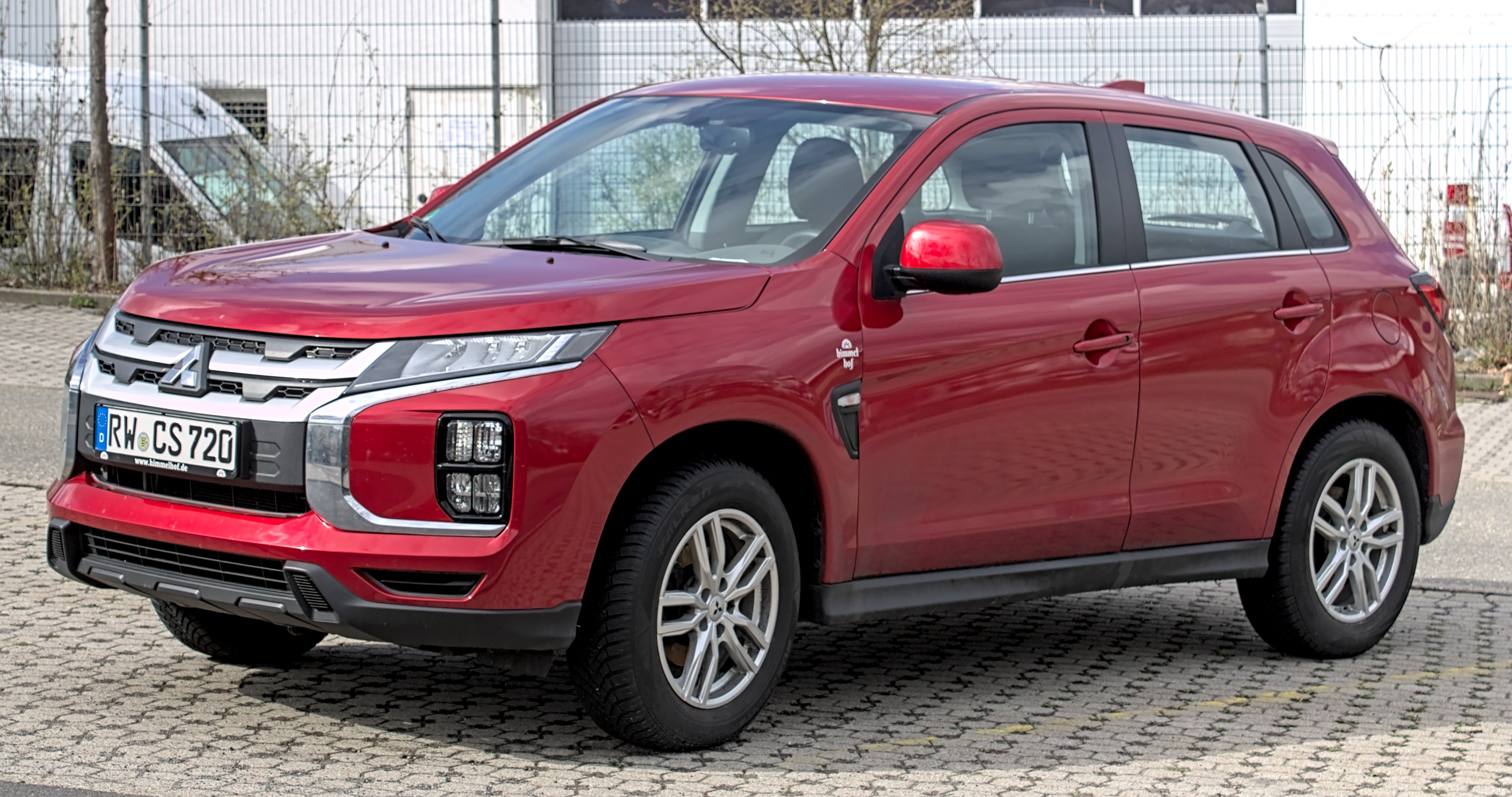
Mitsubishi ASX (third facelift)

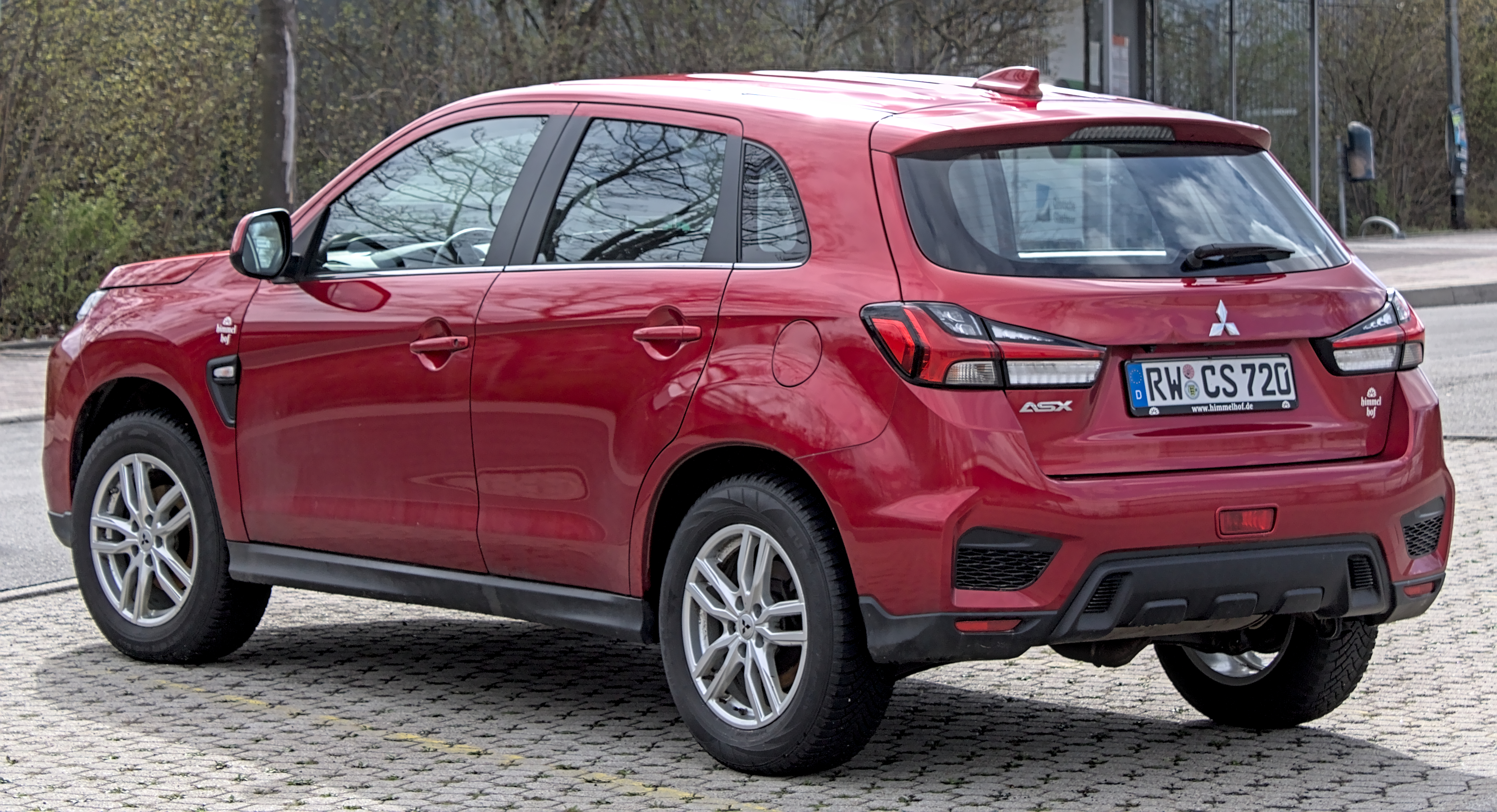
Mitsubishi ASX (third facelift)

=== Powertrains ===
The Japanese models are powered by the 4B10 1.8 L petrol engine mated to a manual or INVECS-III continuously variable transmission. North American, Singaporean, Chinese, Indonesian, Malaysian, Philippine, and Australian vehicles get the larger 4B11 2.0 L and 4B12 2.4 L engines starting from 2015 model year, while the European ASX use a new 4A92 1.6 L petrol engine. In Europe and Australia the 4N13 1.8 L direct-injection turbo-diesel engine is also available as options. With the 2015 model year update in Europe, the Mitsubishi 4N1 engine was replaced with PSA's DV6C engine. Much of the petrol engine range – 1.6 L (117 hp), 1.8 L (140 hp), and 2.0 L (150 hp) – is offered in the CIS market.

=== Markets ===
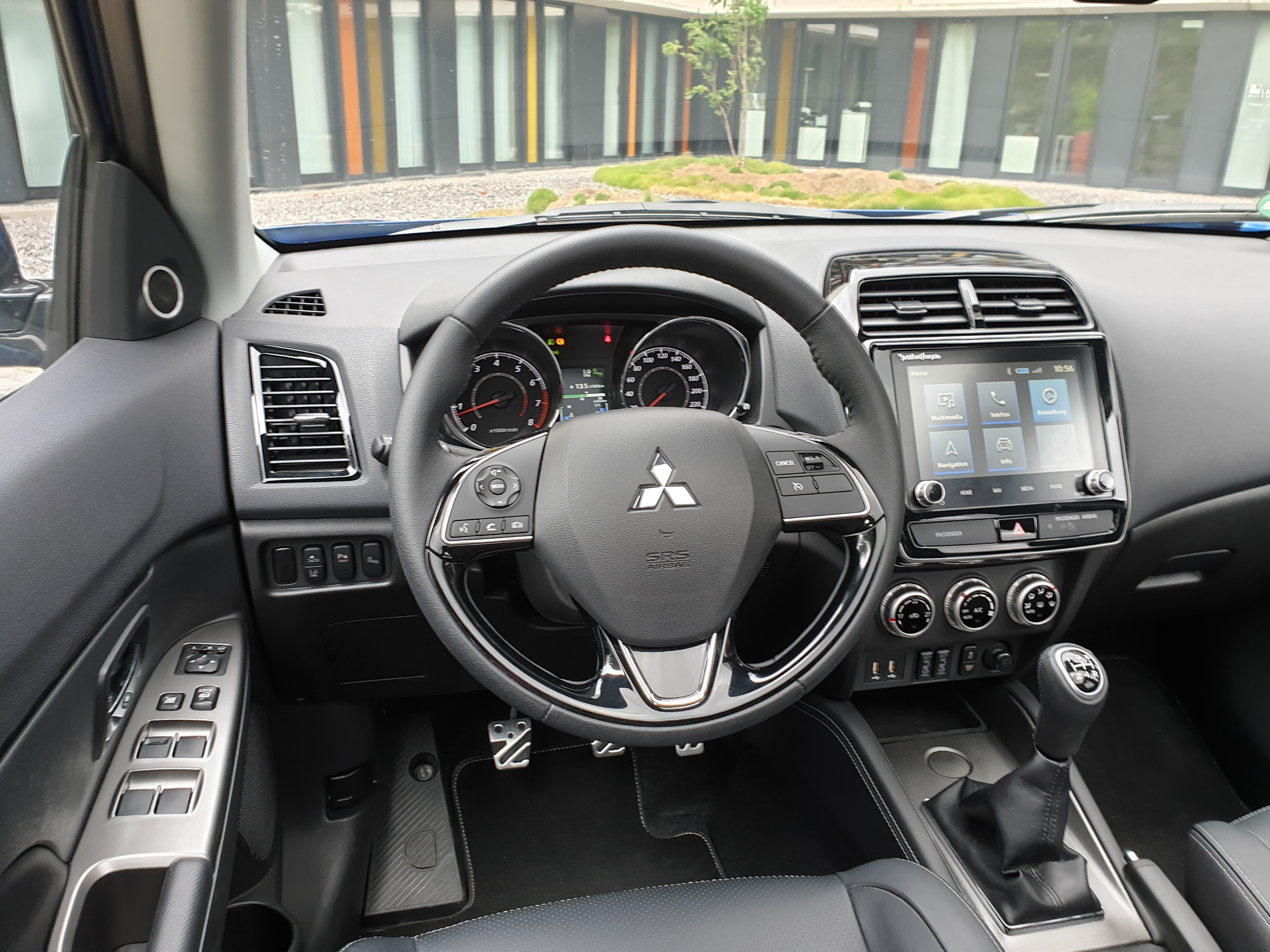
Interior (facelift)

==== Indonesia ====
In Indonesia, the Outlander Sport was launched on 10 July 2012 and offered in three grade levels: GLX, GLS, and PX. It was assembled locally at the Krama Yudha Ratu Motor plant in Pulo Gadung, Jakarta with knock-down kits imported from Japan. Production ended in 2018.

==== Malaysia ====
In Malaysia, the ASX was launched in November 2010. At launch, only one variant was available which was fully imported and powered by a 2.0 L 4B11 engine paired with a CVT transmission. In January 2012, the sole variant was updated with larger alloy wheels, push-start button, better sportive front seats and auto-retractable side mirror. The first facelift was introduced in May 2013 which made features from the limited run Euro edition standard including a panoramic glass roof, auto rain, auto light sensors and GPS navigation with Bluetooth/iPod connectivity. In February 2014, locally assembled models went on sale now with two variants: 2WD and 4WD.

=== Safety ===
ANCAP test results* Mitsubishi ASX (2010)
Test	Score
Overall	5 /5 stars
Frontal offset	14.13/16
Side impact	16/16
Pole	2/2
Seat belt reminders	2/3
Whiplash protection	Not Assessed
Pedestrian protection	Marginal
Electronic stability control	Standard

ANCAP test results* Mitsubishi ASX (2014)
Test	Score
Overall	5 /5 stars
Frontal offset	14.13/16
Side impact	16/16
Pole	2/2
Seat belt reminders	2/3
Whiplash protection	Good
Pedestrian protection	Marginal
Electronic stability control	Standard

== Second generation (2023) ==
In 2016, Mitsubishi Motors executives announced that the successor of the RVR/ASX/Outlander Sport would be released in 2019 and was previewed by the electric eX Concept. The company mentioned that it would be an "in-house"-developed model, however, this successor was never released.

In early 2022, the teaser for the second-generation ASX for European market was released, which would be based on the second-generation Renault Captur. It was revealed in September 2022 and released in March 2023 with gasoline, mild hybrid, hybrid and plug-in hybrid powertrain options.

A facelifted ASX was launched on 23 April 2024; only about a year after the original model. This was the result of the Captur II also receiving a facelift, after five years on the market for the initial design. This facelifted version will also be sold in the Australian market from 2025.

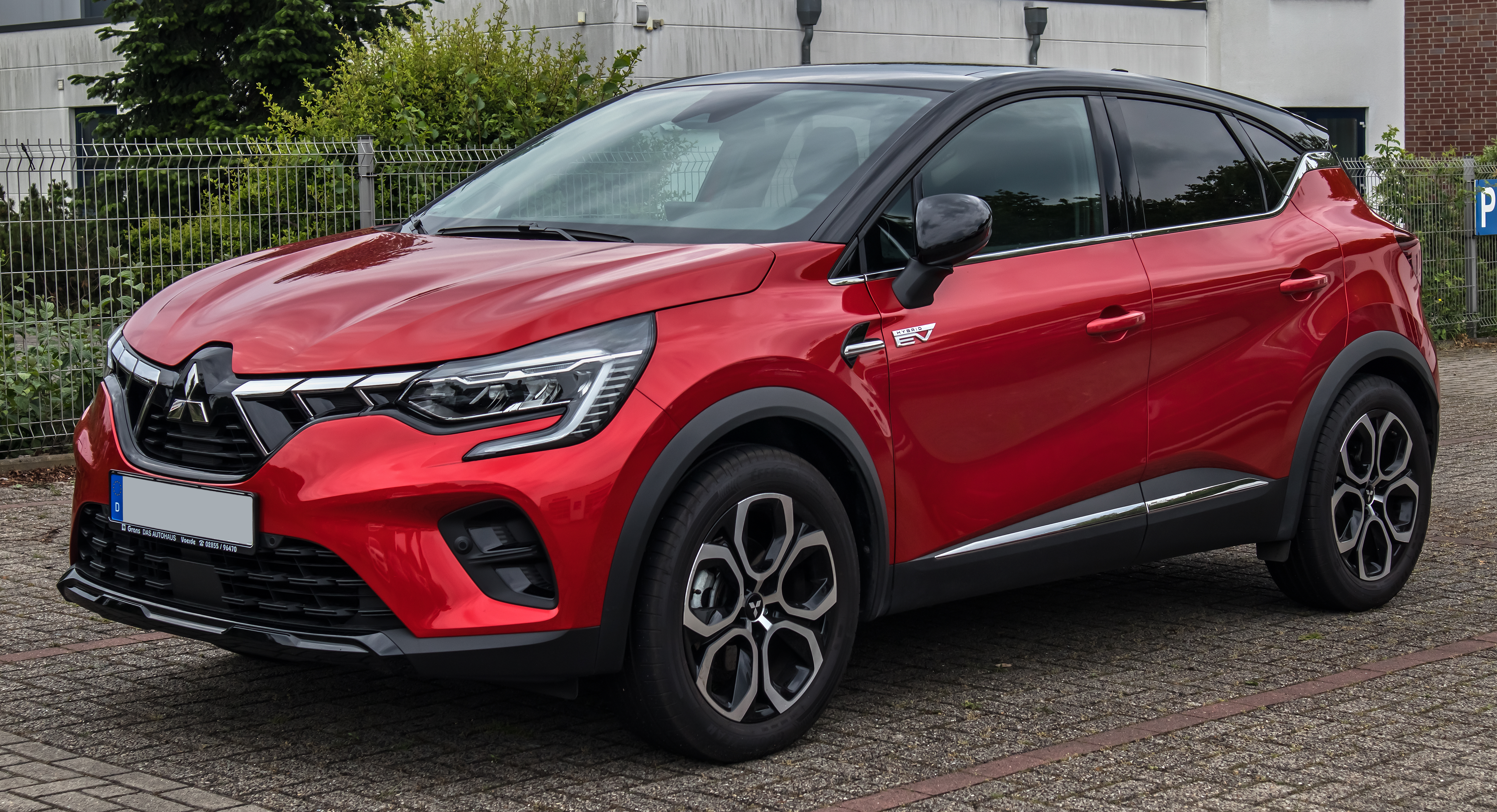
Second-generation Mitsubishi ASX (pre-facelift)

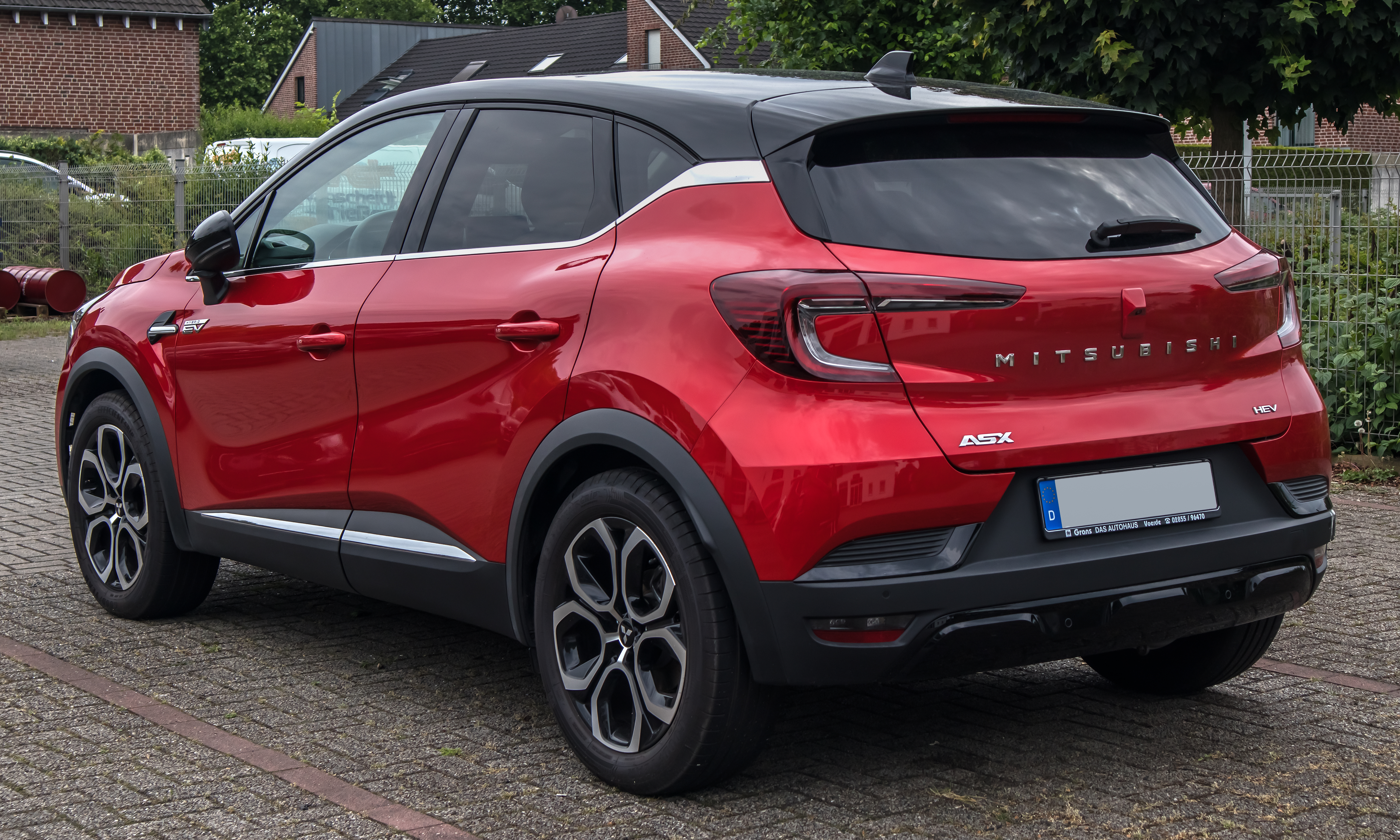
Second-generation Mitsubishi ASX (pre-facelift)

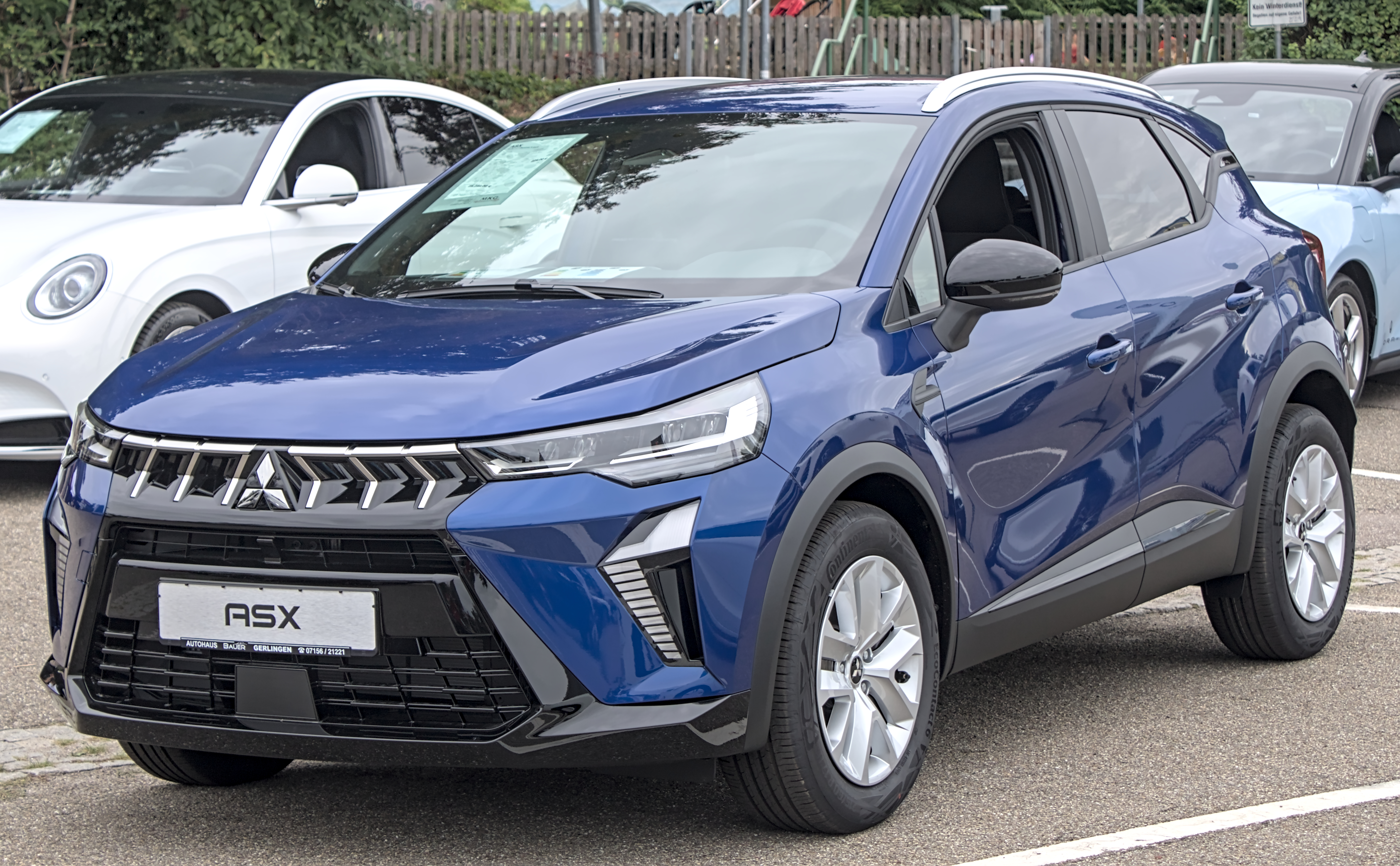
Second-generation Mitsubishi ASX (facelift)

=== Safety ===
ANCAP test results Mitsubishi ASX (2024, aligned with Euro NCAP)
Test	Points	%
Overall:	4 /5 stars	
Adult occupant:	30.61	76%
Child occupant:	40.84	83%
Pedestrian:	48.35	76%
Safety assist:	12.70	70%

== ASX VR-e ==
The Mitsubishi ASX VR-e is a battery electric compact crossover SUV developed by Mitsubishi Motors in partnership with Taiwanese manufacturer Foxtron. It is a rebadged version of the Foxtron Bria, features a 57.7 kWh lithium iron phosphate battery, and is scheduled to launch in Australia and New Zealand in late 2026.

== Production and sales ==
=== Annual production ===
Fiscal year	Production						Total
Fiscal year	Japan		United States	China	Malaysia	Brazil	Total
Fiscal year	Okazaki	Mizushima	United States	China	Malaysia	Brazil	Total
2009	6,915	–	–	–	–	–	6,915
2010	134,004	–	–	–	–	–	134,004
2011	145,608	–	–	–	–	–	145,608
2012	103,603	–	39,998	8,205	–	–	151,806
2013	79,381	–	69,766	41,484	–	–	190,631
2014	101,473	–	61,974	60,892	–	3,870	228,209
2015	93,282	–	38,186	46,256	2,310	7,560	187,594
2016	138,324	–	–	33,927	2,168	1,740	176,159
2017	85,493	34,586	–	32,617	618	8,018	161,332
2018	8	112,173	–	25,628	416	3,964	142,189

(Sources: Facts & Figures 2013, Facts & Figures 2018, Facts & Figures 2019, Mitsubishi Motors website)
including OEM production supply (Citroën C4 Aircross and Peugeot 4008)

=== Sales ===
Calendar year	U.S.	Canada	Europe	China	Australia
2010	1,690	801	20,935		2,349
2011	16,443	7,064	48,520		6,430
2012	19,466	6,334	32,265		6,960
2013	24,951	7,693	26,468	36,054	7,721
2014	31,054	6,594	35,295	55,420	10,404
2015	36,966	5,786	45,228	50,781	13,557
2016	33,067	6,196	39,241	35,146	18,126
2017	33,160	6,973	39,160	29,333	19,403
2018	36,867	5,750	30,958	29,789	19,034
2019	26,144	7,463	30,622	19,871	20,806
2020	28,835	4,681	17,983	10,137	14,056
2021	34,214	8,703	6,271	6,006	14,764
2022	16,374		29	1,578	12,753
2023	15,016	8,090		1,622	9,176
2024	15,124	7,402			12,330
2025	20,480	8,042			

== See also ==
- Foxtron Bria
