= Mitsubishi 4J1 engine =

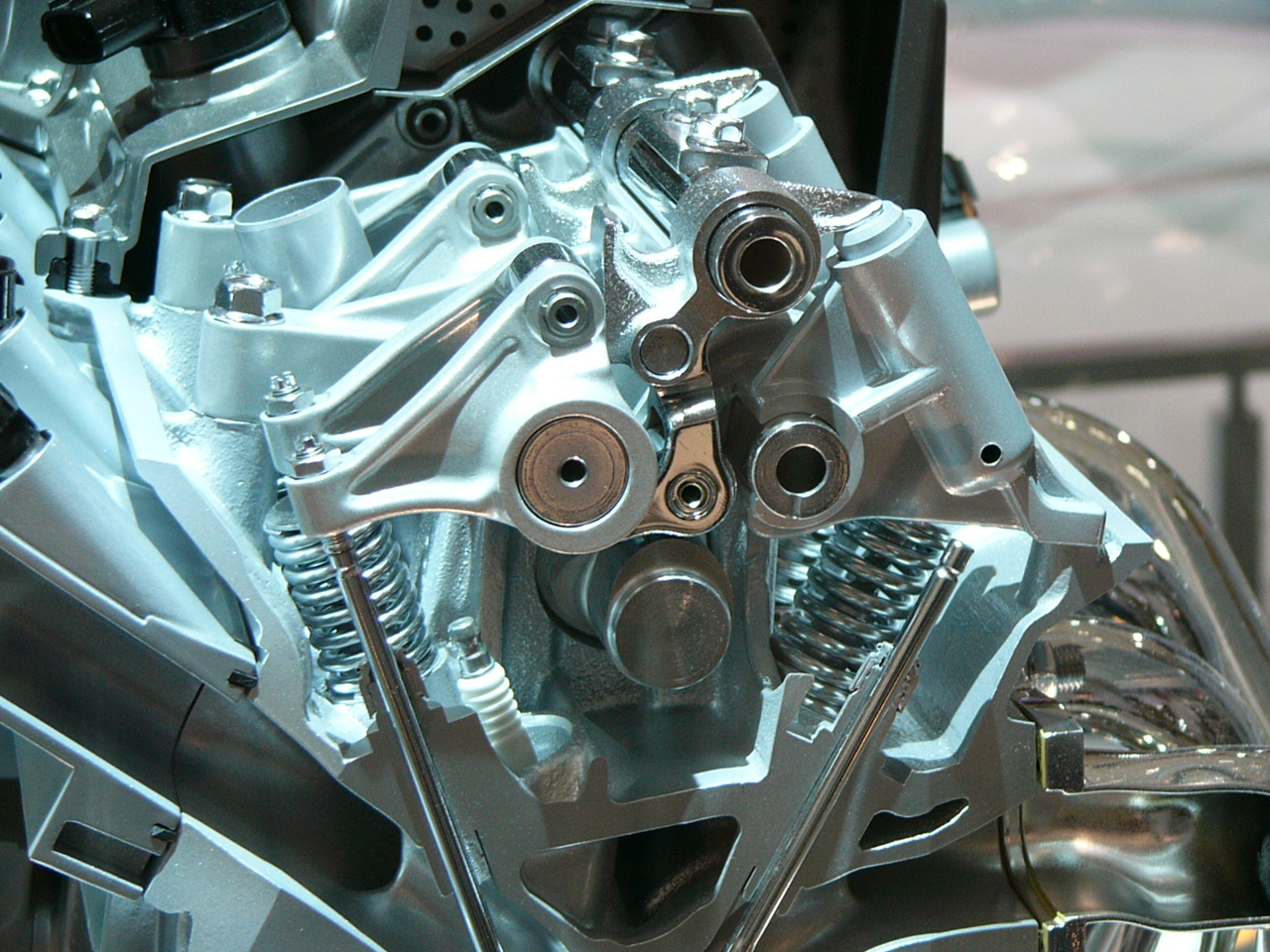

Overview
- Manufacturer: Mitsubishi Motors
- Production: 2011–present

Layout
- Configuration: Naturally aspirated 4-cylinder
- Displacement: 1.8–2.4 L (1,798–2,360 cc)
- Cylinder bore: 86 mm (3.39 in); 88 mm (3.46 in)
- Piston stroke: 77.4 mm (3.05 in); 86 mm (3.39 in); 97 mm (3.82 in)
- Cylinder block material: Aluminium die cast
- Cylinder head material: Aluminium die cast
- Valvetrain: Direct acting SOHC, 16 valves, continuously variable MIVEC intake valve timing
- Compression ratio: 10.5:1-10.7:1

Combustion
- Fuel system: Multi-port fuel injection
- Fuel type: Gasoline
- Cooling system: Water-cooled

Output
- Power output: 102–124 kW (139–169 PS)
- Torque output: 172–220 N⋅m (127–162 lb⋅ft)

Chronology
- Predecessor: Mitsubishi 4B1 engine (1.8–2.4L DOHC)

The Mitsubishi 4J1 engine is a range of all-alloy straight-4 engines. The main goal was declared as reduction on-road CO_{2} emission on new vehicles. According to cars specifications fuel consumption also was improved. Comparing to previous engine series (4B1) valvetrain configuration was changed from DOHC to SOHC, Variable valve lift (VVL) technology added. The engine usually is paired with the ecological features like Start-Stop system and EGR. That engine mostly is appearing in the cars Lancer X, ASX, Outlander on several markets across Japan, Europe and Latin America.

== 4J10 ==
=== Specifications ===
Engine type	Inline 4-cylinder SOHC 16v, MIVEC
Displacement	1.8 L (1,798 cc)
Bore x Stroke	86 mm × 77.4 mm (3.39 in × 3.05 in)
Compression ratio	10.7:1
Fuel system	ECI multiple
Peak power	102 kW (139 PS; 137 hp) at 6000 rpm(jin-net)
Peak torque	172 N⋅m (127 lb⋅ft)17.9kgm at 4200 rpm (jin-net)

=== Applications ===
- 2013 Mitsubishi RVR (Japan)
- 2017 Mitsubishi Grand Lancer (Taiwan)
- 2015 Mitsubishi Lancer

=== Characteristics ===
The new 4J10 MIVEC engine features the use of a next-generation MIVEC system that continuously regulates intake valve lift, opening duration and timing. The new MIVEC system together with improved combustion stability and a reduction in piston friction provide an improvement in fuel economy without any loss in engine performance (output and torque) over the 4B10 MIVEC engine (1.8-liter, inline-4, 16-valve DOHC).

== 4J11 ==
=== Specifications ===
Engine type	Inline 4-cylinder SOHC 16v, MIVEC
Displacement	2.0 L (1,998 cc)
Bore x Stroke	86 mm × 86 mm (3.39 in × 3.39 in)
Compression ratio	10.5:1
Fuel system	Electronically controlled MPI
Peak power	110 kW (150 PS) at 6000 rpm
Peak torque	195 N⋅m (144 lb⋅ft) at 4100-4200 rpm

=== Applications ===
- 2013-2019 Mitsubishi Outlander
- 2020- Mitsubishi ASX

=== Characteristics ===
The 4J11 engine is the newly developed engine further improving the fuel economy. This engine can keep the same output performance as the conventional 4B11 engine by using the new MIVEC system.

== 4J12 ==
=== Specifications ===
Engine type	Inline 4-cylinder SOHC 16v, MIVEC
Displacement	2.4 L (2,360 cc)
Bore x Stroke	88 mm × 97 mm (3.5 in × 3.8 in)
Compression ratio	10.5:1
Fuel system	Electronically controlled MPI
Peak power	124 kW (169 PS) at 6000 rpm(eec-net 歐盟淨值)
Peak torque	220 N⋅m (162 lb⋅ft) at 4200 rpm(eec-net 歐盟精緻) （10ps net=10.7ps gross；10NM NET =10.7NM GROSS）

=== Applications ===
- 2016 Mitsubishi Outlander (Only vehicles for South Africa and Argentina)
- 2016 - 2020 Mitsubishi Outlander (ES, SE, LE, SEL Trims in United States and Puerto Rico)
- 2013 - 2017 Mitsubishi Outlander (Australia)

=== Characteristics ===
"Eco friendly" replacement for 4B12.

== See also ==
- List of Mitsubishi engines
