= Mitsubishi 4B1 engine =

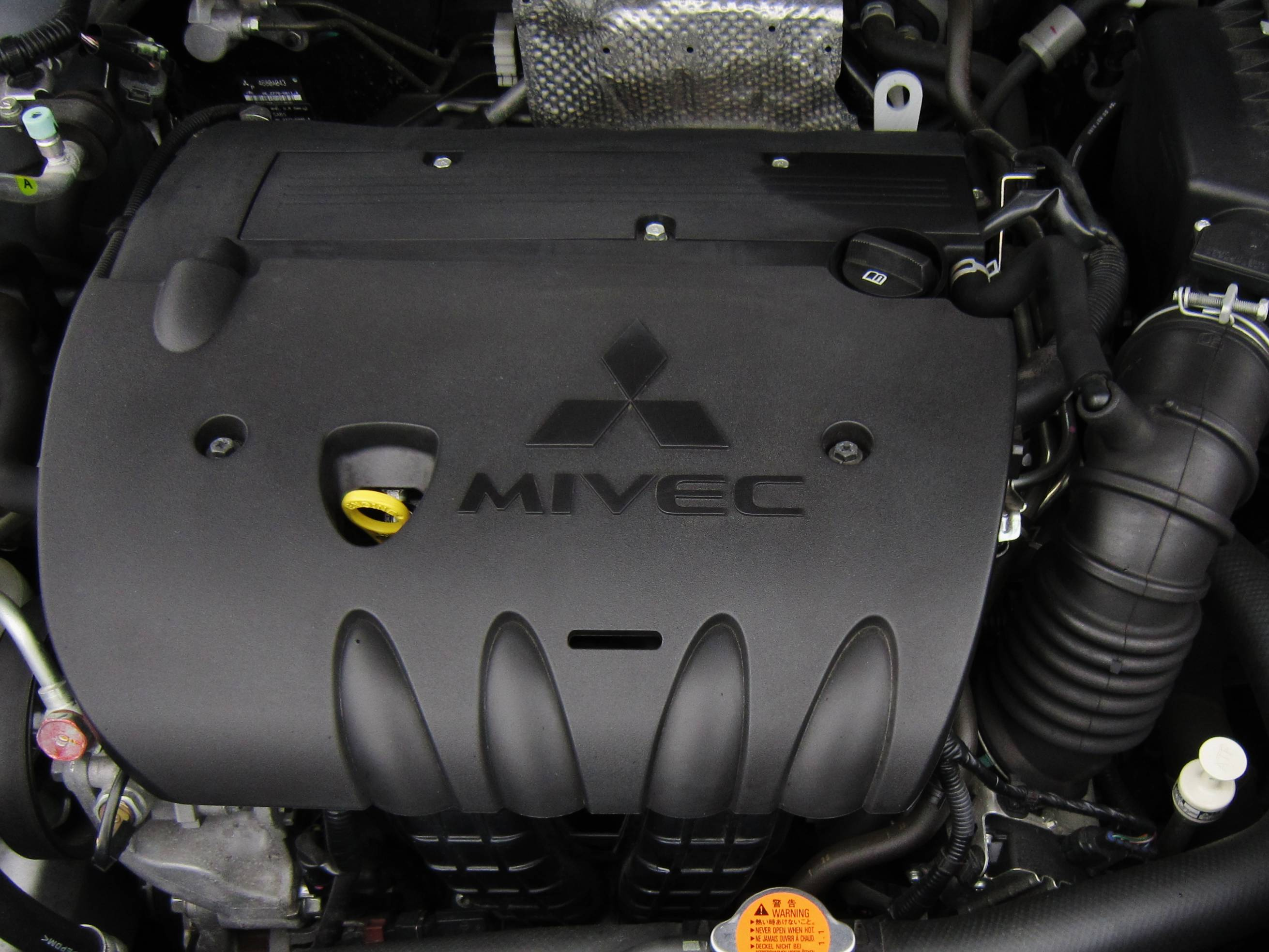

Overview
- Manufacturer: Mitsubishi Motors
- Also called: World Engine
- Production: 2007–present

Layout
- Configuration: Inline-four
- Displacement: 1.8 L (1,798 cc); 2.0 L (1,998 cc); 2.4 L (2,360 cc)
- Cylinder bore: 86 mm (3.39 in); 88 mm (3.46 in)
- Piston stroke: 77.4 mm (3.05 in); 86 mm (3.39 in); 97 mm (3.82 in)
- Cylinder block material: Aluminium die cast
- Cylinder head material: Aluminium die cast
- Valvetrain: Direct acting DOHC, 16 valves, continuously variable MIVEC intake and exhaust valve timing
- Compression ratio: 9.0:1, 10.0:1, 10.5:1,

Combustion
- Turbocharger: On some versions
- Fuel system: Fuel injection
- Fuel type: Gasoline
- Cooling system: Water-cooled

Output
- Power output: From 140 to 446 PS (103 to 328 kW; 138 to 440 bhp)
- Torque output: From 14.5 to 56.961 kg⋅m (142 to 559 N⋅m; 105 to 412 lbf⋅ft)

Chronology
- Predecessor: Mitsubishi Sirius engine (Gasoline Engine)
- Successor: Mitsubishi 4J1 engine (SOHC); Mitsubishi 4B4 engine (DOHC)

The Mitsubishi 4B1 engine is a range of all-alloy straight-4 piston engines built at Mitsubishi's Japanese "World Engine" powertrain plant in Shiga on the basis of the Global Engine Manufacturing Alliance (GEMA). Although the basic designs of the various engines are the same, their exact specifications are individually tailored for each partner (Chrysler, Mitsubishi, and Hyundai). The cylinder block and other basic structural parts of the engine were jointly developed by the GEMA companies, but the intake and exhaust manifolds, the cylinder head's intake and exhaust ports, and other elements related to engine tuning were independently developed by Mitsubishi.

All engines developed within this family have aluminium cylinder block and head, 4 valves per cylinder, double overhead camshaft layouts, and MIVEC continuous variable valve timing. All variations of 4B1 engine share the same engine block with a 96 mm bore pitch. The difference in displacement is achieved by variance in bore and stroke.

The 4B1 engine family is the first to have the continuously variable valve timing MIVEC system applied not only to its intake valves but also to its exhaust valves. The intake and exhaust cam timing is continuously independently controlled and provide four optimized engine operating modes.

== 4B10 (1.8L 4 Cylinder NA) ==
=== Specifications ===
Engine type	Inline 4-cylinder DOHC 16v, MIVEC
Displacement	1.8 L (1,798 cc)
Bore	86 mm (3.39 in)
Stroke	77.4 mm (3.05 in)
Compression ratio	10.5:1
Fuel system	ECI-MULTI
Peak power	103–105 kW (140–143 PS; 138–141 bhp) at 6000 rpm
Peak torque	17.5 kg⋅m (172 N⋅m; 127 lbf⋅ft) at 4250 rpm

=== Applications ===
- 2007-2017 Mitsubishi Lancer
- 2010 Mitsubishi RVR (Japan)
- 2010-2015 Proton Inspira

== 4B11 (2.0L 4 Cylinder NA) ==
=== Specifications ===
Engine type	Inline 4-cylinder DOHC 16v, MIVEC (intake only on PHEV)
Displacement	2.0 L (1,998 cc)
Bore	86 mm (3.39 in)
Stroke	86 mm (3.39 in)
Compression ratio	10.0:1 10.5:1 (PHEV)
Fuel system	ECI-MULTI
Peak power	110–116 kW (150–158 PS; 148–156 bhp) at 6000 rpm 87 kW (118 PS; 117 bhp) at 4500 rpm (PHEV)
Peak torque	20.3 kg⋅m (199 N⋅m; 147 lbf⋅ft) at 4250 rpm 19.4 kg⋅m (190 N⋅m; 140 lbf⋅ft) at 4500 rpm (PHEV)

=== Applications ===
- 2007-2017 Mitsubishi Lancer/Galant Fortis
- 2012-2017 Citroen C4 Aircross
- 2007–2012 Peugeot 4007
- 2012-2017 Peugeot 4008
- 2009 Mitsubishi Outlander (Facelift Europe)
- 2012 Mitsubishi Outlander Sport
- 2013 Mitsubishi Outlander PHEV
- 2010 Mitsubishi ASX, Mitsubishi RVR (Canada)
- 2010-2015 Proton Inspira
- 2007-present Mitsubishi Delica
- 2018-present Mitsubishi Eclipse Cross

=== Characteristics ===
The bore and stroke of the engine both measure 86 mm (3.39 in), which engineers refer to as square. According to Mitsubishi, the new cylinder dimensions contribute to a free-revving character (max power at 6500 rpm), linear power delivery and wide torque curve. Mitsubishi used a timing chain instead of a belt for better reliability and iridium spark plugs to lower emissions and to help extend major service intervals for lower cost of ownership. To reduce weight, Mitsubishi used a plastic cam cover and intake manifold and double-layer stainless steel exhaust manifold. The exhaust manifold has a rear location on the transverse engine, compared to the front location for the previous engine, yielding important benefits such as better emissions performance. To lower vibration, Mitsubishi used a 4-point inertial axis system with cylindrical hydraulic engine mounts on the left and right sides. A lightweight, high-rigidity squeeze-cast aluminium bracket on the right side mount (engine side) lowers engine noise under acceleration. A lightweight, high-rigidity steel plate bracket on the left side mount (transmission side) lowers gear noise. A custom-tuned insulator was developed for the front and rear mounts to help control both idle vibration and acceleration shock.

For the Mitsubishi Outlander PHEV, a modified variant of the 4B11 is adopted. The MIVEC VVT system is only applied on the intake side, a balancer shaft derived from the 4B12 is adopted (in place of the standard oil pump), a linear Air/Fuel sensor fitted in place of the Oxygen sensor of front intake, unsymmetrical piston skirts, different pattern piston skirt resin coating & a unique resin coating crank shaft bearing is used. The PHEV 4B11 is restricted to a maximum operating speed of 4500 rpm to prevent damage to the electrical motors & generator from overspeeding.

== 4B11T (2.0L 4 Cylinder Turbo) ==
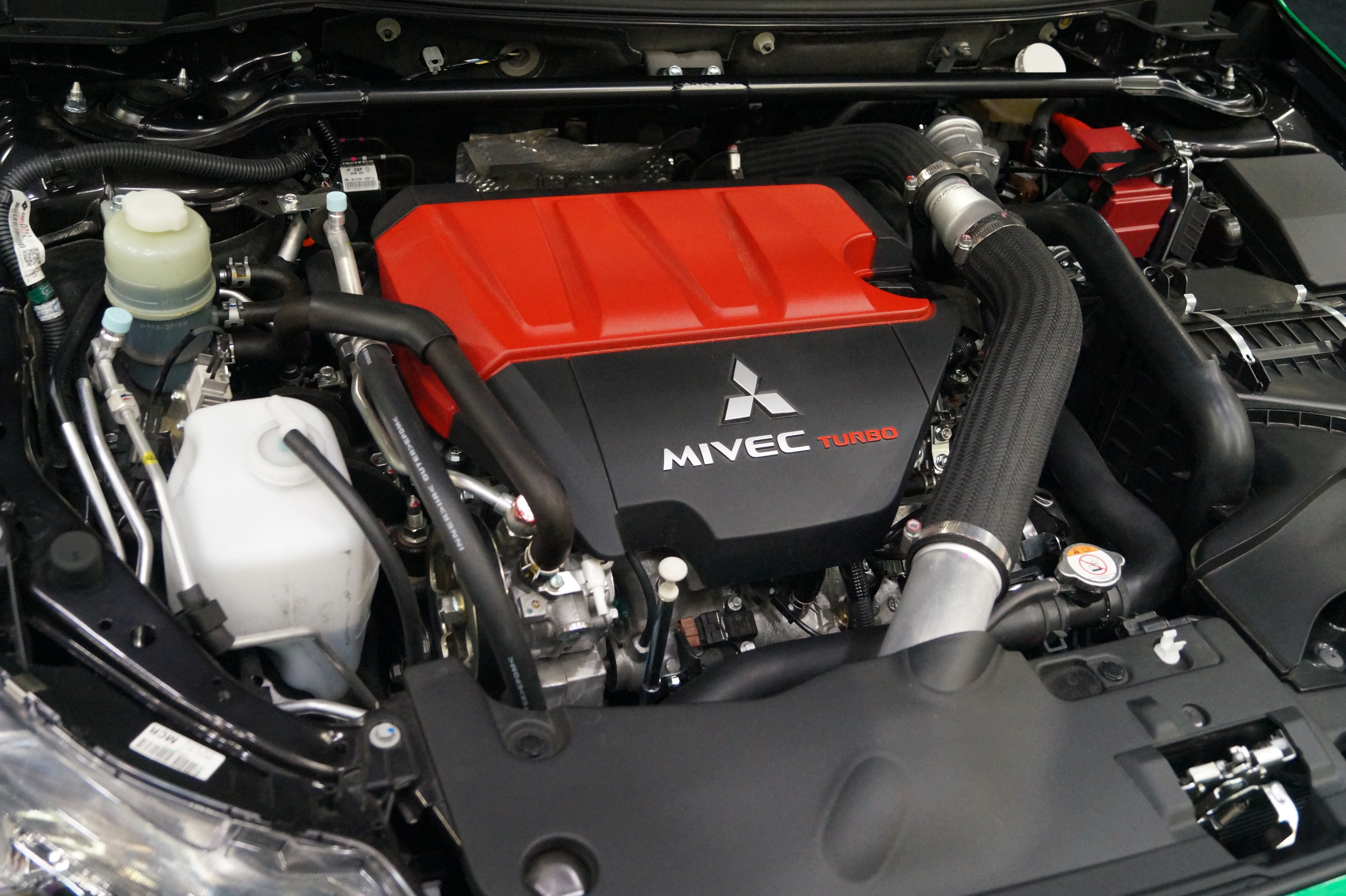
4B11T engine on the Lancer Evolution X

=== Specifications ===
Engine type	Inline-four engine DOHC 4 valves per cylinder, Turbo MIVEC
Displacement	1,998 cc (2.0 L; 121.9 cu in)
Bore	86 mm (3.39 in)
Stroke	86 mm (3.39 in)
Compression ratio	9.0:1
Fuel system	ECI-MULTI
Peak power	280 PS (276 hp; 206 kW) at 6500 rpm (Japanese market); 291 PS (287 hp; 214 kW) at 6500 rpm (US market); 240 PS (237 hp; 177 kW) (Lancer Ralliart); 295 PS (291 hp; 217 kW) at 6500 rpm (European market); 409 PS (403 hp; 301 kW) at 6500 rpm (UK only FQ400); 446 PS (440 hp; 328 kW) at 6800 rpm (UK only FQ440 Last Edition)
Peak torque	422 N⋅m (311 lb⋅ft) at 3500 rpm (Japanese market); 407 N⋅m (300 lb⋅ft) at 4400 rpm (US market); 353 N⋅m (260 lb⋅ft) at 3000 rpm (Lancer Ralliart); 366 N⋅m (270 lb⋅ft) at 3500 rpm (European market); 525 N⋅m (387 lb⋅ft) at 3500 rpm (UK only FQ400); 559 N⋅m (412 lb⋅ft) at 3100 rpm (UK only FQ440 Last Edition)

=== Applications ===
- 2007-2016 Mitsubishi Lancer Evolution X
- 2008-2015 Mitsubishi Lancer/Galant Fortis Ralliart (detuned with smaller turbo)

=== Characteristics ===
Peak power and torque figures of 280 PS (276 bhp; 206 kW) and 422 N⋅m (311 lb⋅ft) are for Japanese market Lancer Evolution models and figures of 295 PS (291 bhp; 217 kW) and 407 N⋅m (300 lb⋅ft) are for US market models.

The 4B11T is the first engine in the Lancer Evolution series that uses a die-cast aluminium cylinder block versus the cast-iron block used in the previous turbocharged 4G63 engine that powered all previous models. The engine weight has been reduced by 12 kg (26 lb) compared to the 4G63, even with the addition of a timing chain instead of a belt and MIVEC continuous variable valve timing on both the intake and exhaust camshafts (the 4G63 had MIVEC valve timing & lift switching type on the intake only). A revised turbocharger offers up to 20-percent quicker response at lower engine speeds compared to previous 4G63. The 4B11T offers a broader torque curve, producing more torque than the 4G63 at all engine speeds, helped by the engine's square bore and stroke design, both measure 86 mm (3.39 in). Redline tachometer hashes start at 7,000 rpm, with a fuel cutout (true redline) at 7600 rpm to protect the engine.

A semi-closed deck structure, an integrated ladder frame and four-bolt main bearing caps contribute to engine strength, durability, and lower NVH levels. Unlike the 4G63, the 4B11T does not use a balancer shaft. The semi-floating pistons of the 4G63 have been replaced with fully floating pistons for the 4B11T. Aluminium is also used for the timing chain case and cylinder head cover. The engine features an electronically controlled throttle, an isometric short port aluminium intake manifold, and the stainless steel exhaust manifold is positioned at the rear of the engine. The use of a direct-acting valvetrain eliminates the need of the roller rocker arm configuration previously used in the 4G63. The 4B11T features built-up hollow camshafts and its valve stem seals are integrated with the spring seats. The internal components of the 4B11T engine have been reinforced to withstand high levels of boost.

== 4B12 (2.4L 4 Cylinder NA) ==
=== Specifications ===
Engine type	Inline 4-cylinder DOHC 16v, MIVEC
Displacement	2,360 cc (2.4 L)
Bore	88 mm (3.46 in)
Stroke	97 mm (3.82 in)
Compression ratio	10.5:1; 11.8:1 (Outlander PHEV)
Fuel system	ECI-MULTI
Peak power	125 kW (170 PS; 168 bhp) at 6000 rpm
Peak torque	Between 226 and 232 N⋅m (167 and 171 lb⋅ft) at 4100 rpm depending on region.

Applications:
- 2007 Mitsubishi Delica
- 2008 Mitsubishi Lancer
- 2008 Citroën C-Crosser
- 2008 Peugeot 4007
- 2009 Mitsubishi Lancer Sportback GTS
- 2009 Mitsubishi Lancer GTS
- 2009 Mitsubishi Outlander (Facelift Europe)
- 2010 Mitsubishi Galant
- 2012 Mitsubishi Lancer SE AWC
- 2013 Mitsubishi Lancer GT Manual
- 2015 Mitsubishi Lancer
- 2018 Mitsubishi RVR
- 2019 Mitsubishi Outlander PHEV (Techlift Europe and Asia)
- 2021 Mitsubishi Outlander PHEV (Techlift North America)
- 2021 Mitsubishi Eclipse Cross PHEV
- 2023 Mitsubishi Outlander PHEV / 2026 Nissan Rogue Plug-in Hybrid

=== Characteristics ===
The cylinder head intake and exhaust ports and intake and exhaust manifolds are shape optimized for better volumetric efficiency. Mitsubishi lowered the friction of the engine by including elastic grinding of the valve stems, adopting a high-efficiency shroud equipped plastic impeller in the water pump and using 0W-20 low-viscosity oil. Mitsubishi increased the combustion efficiency by optimizing the design of the cylinder head intake and exhaust ports, by incorporating the MIVEC system on both intake and exhaust valves and by using injectors that give an ultra micro droplet fuel spray. To lower the engine's weight, Mitsubishi used die-cast aluminium for the cylinder block, plastic for the cylinder head cover and intake manifold, and stainless steel for the exhaust manifold. The engine features a compact balance shaft module with an integrated oil pump. A silent chain is used to drive the camshafts. The compact balancer module, the silent chain, the stable combustion yielded by the intake and exhaust MIVEC system, and high rigidity designs for the cylinder head and cylinder block realize low vibration and noise.

== See also ==
- Chrysler World engine - Chrysler's GEMA built engines
- Hyundai Theta engine - Hyundai's GEMA built engines
- List of Mitsubishi engines
