= MIVEC =

Automobile variable valve timing technology

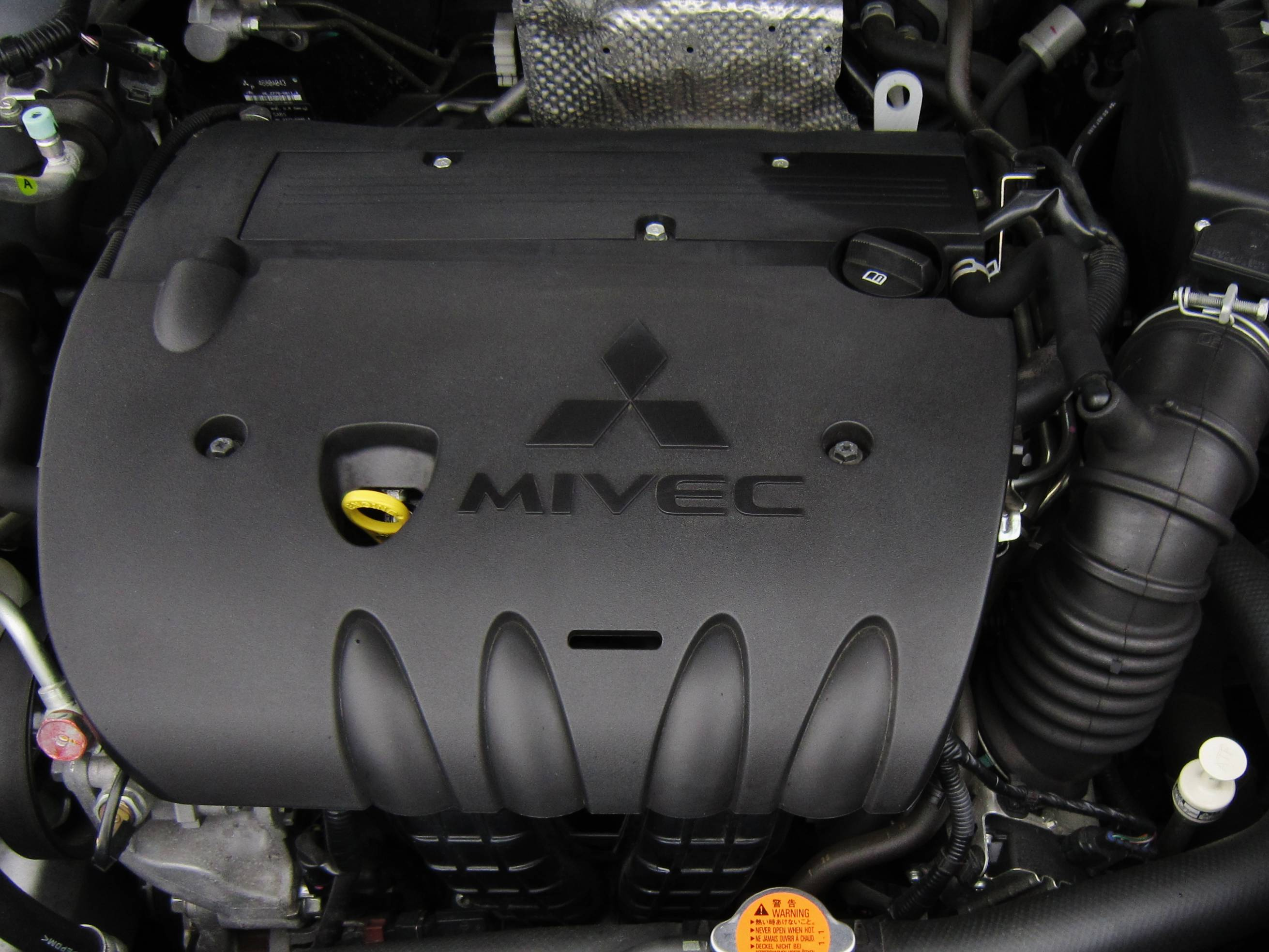
4B11 MIVEC engine

MIVEC (Mitsubishi Innovative Valve timing Electronic Control system) is the brand name of a variable valve timing (VVT) engine technology developed by Mitsubishi Motors. MIVEC, as with other similar systems, varies the timing of the intake and exhaust camshafts which increases the power and torque output over a broad engine speed range while also being able to help spool a turbocharger more quickly and accurately.

MIVEC was first introduced in 1992 in their 4G92 powerplant, a 1,597 cc naturally aspirated DOHC 16 valve straight-4. At the time, the first generation of the system was named Mitsubishi Innovative Valve timing and lift Electronic Control. The first cars to use this were the Mitsubishi Mirage hatchback and the Mitsubishi Lancer sedan. While the conventional 4G92 engine provided 145 PS (107 kW; 143 hp) at 7000 rpm, the MIVEC-equipped engine could achieve 175 PS (129 kW; 173 hp) at 7500 rpm. Similar improvements were seen when the technology was applied to the 1994 Mitsubishi FTO, whose top-spec GPX variant had a 6A12 1997 cc DOHC 24-valve V6 with peak power of 200 PS (147 kW; 197 hp) at 7500 rpm. The GR model, whose otherwise identical powerplant was not MIVEC-equipped, produced 170 PS (125 kW; 168 hp) at 7000 rpm by comparison.

Although initially designed to enhance performance, the system has subsequently been developed to improve economy and emissions, and has been introduced across Mitsubishi's range of vehicles, from the Mitsubishi i kei car to the high-performance Lancer Evolution sedan to the Mirage/Space Star global economy car.

Newest developments have led to MIVEC system being evolved into a continuous variable valve timing and also being the first VVT system to be used into a passenger car diesel engine.

== Operation ==
Variable valve control systems optimize more power and torque by varying valve opening times and/or duration. Some of these valve control systems optimize performance at low and mid-range engine speeds, while others focus on enhancing only high-rpm power. The MIVEC system provides both of these benefits by controlling valve timing and lift. The basic operation of the MIVEC system is altering the cam profiles and thus tailoring engine performance in response to driver input.

In essence, MIVEC serves the same function as "swapping cams", something that car racers might do when modifying older-design engines to produce more power. However, such swaps come with a compromise - generally yielding either greater low-end torque or more high-end horsepower, but not both. MIVEC achieves both goals. With MIVEC, the "cam swap" occurs automatically at a fixed engine speed. The Cam Switch operation is transparent to the driver, who is simply rewarded with a smooth flow of power.

Two distinct cam profiles are used to provide two engine modes: a low-speed mode, consisting of low-lift cam profiles; and a high-speed mode. The low-lift cams and rocker arms - which drive separate intake valves - are positioned on either side of a centrally located high-lift cam. Each of the intake valves is operated by a low-lift cam and rocker arm, while placing a T-lever between them allows the valves to follow the action of the high-lift cam.

At low speeds, The T-lever's wing section floats freely, enabling the low-lift cams to operate the valves. The intake rocker arms contain internal pistons, which are retained by springs in a lowered position while the engine speed is below the MIVEC switchover point, to avoid contacting the high-lift T-shaped levers. At high speeds, hydraulic pressure elevates the hydraulic pistons, causing the T-lever to push against the rocker arm, which in turn makes the high-lift cam operate the valves.

MIVEC switches to the higher cam profile as engine speed increases, and drops back to the lower cam profile as engine speed decreases. The reduced valve overlap in low-speed mode provides stable idling, while accelerated timing of the intake valve's closing reduces backflow to improve volumetric efficiency, which helps increase engine output as well as reduce lift friction. High-speed mode takes advantage of the pulsating intake effect created by the mode's high lift and retarded timing of intake valve closure. The resulting reduced pumping loss of the larger valve overlap yields higher power output and a reduction in friction. The low- and high-speed modes overlap for a brief period, boosting torque.

From the 4B1 engine family onward, MIVEC has evolved into a continuous variable valve timing (CVVT) system (dual VVT on intake and exhaust valves). Many older implementations only vary the valve timing (the amount of time per engine revolution that the intake port is open) and not the lift. Timing is continuously independently controlled to provide four optimized engine-operating modes:

- Under most conditions, to ensure highest fuel efficiency, valve overlap is increased to reduce pumping losses. The exhaust valve opening timing is retarded for higher expansion ratio, enhancing fuel economy.
- When maximum power is demanded (high engine speed and load), intake valve closing timing is retarded to synchronize the intake air pulsations for larger air volume.
- Under low-speed, high load, MIVEC ensures optimal torque delivery with the intake valve closing timing advanced to ensure sufficient air volume. At the same time, the exhaust valve opening timing is retarded to provide a higher expansion ratio and improved efficiency.
- At idle, valve overlap is eliminated to stabilize combustion.

Mitsubishi's 4N1 engine family is the world's first to feature a variable valve timing system applied to passenger car diesel engines.

== MIVEC-MD ==
In the early years of developing its MIVEC technology, Mitsubishi also introduced a variant dubbed MIVEC-MD (Modulated Displacement), a form of variable displacement. Under a light throttle load, the intake and exhaust valves in two of the cylinders would remain closed, and the reduced pumping losses gave a claimed 10–20 percent improvement in fuel economy. Modulated Displacement was dropped around 1996.

== Current implementations ==
Engine code	Capacity	Configuration	Year
3A90	999 cc	Straight-3	(2012–present)
3A92	1193 cc	Straight-3	(2012–present)
3B20	659 cc	Straight-3	(2005–present)
4A90	1332 cc	Straight-4	(2003–present)
4A91	1499 cc	Straight-4	(2003–present)
4A92	1590 cc	Straight-4	(2010–present)
4B10	1798 cc	Straight-4	(2007–present)
4B11	1998 cc	Straight-4	(2007–present)
4B12	2359 cc	Straight-4	(2007–present)
4G15	1468 cc	Straight-4	(2003–present)
4G69	2378 cc	Straight-4	(2003–present)
4N13	1798 cc	Straight-4 diesel	(2010–present)
4N14	2268 cc	Straight-4 diesel	(2010-present)
4N15	2442 cc	Straight-4 diesel	(2015-present)
6B31	2998 cc	V6	(2006–present)
6G75	3828 cc	V6	(2005–present)

== Past implementations ==
Engine code	Capacity	Configuration	Year
4G19	1343 cc	Straight-4	(2002–06)
4G92	1597 cc	Straight-4	(1992–99)
4G63T	1997 cc	Straight-4	(2005–07)
6A12	1998 cc	V6	(1993–2000)
6G72	2972 cc	V6	(1995–97)
6G74	3497 cc	V6	(1997–2000)

== See also ==
- VTEC
- VVT-i
