= Mitsubishi 4A9 engine =

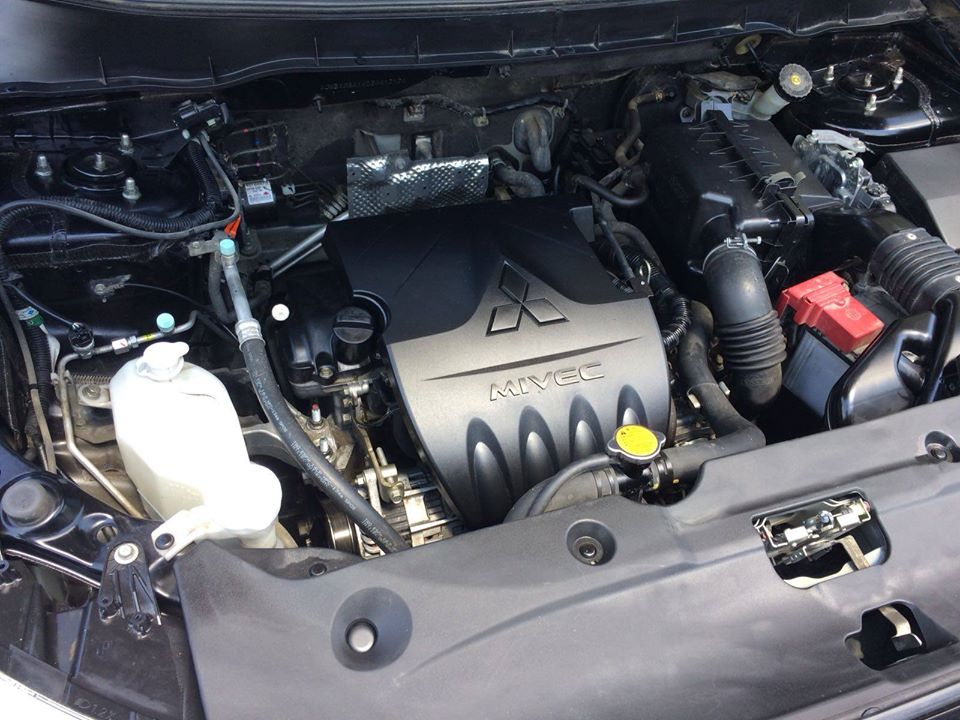

Overview
- Manufacturer: Mitsubishi Motors; MDC Power
- Production: 2004–present (1.3 and 1.5); 2010–present (1.6)

Layout
- Configuration: Naturally aspirated Straight-4
- Displacement: 1.3 L (1,332 cc); 1.5 L (1,499 cc); 1.6 L (1,590 cc)
- Cylinder bore: 75 mm (2.95 in)
- Piston stroke: 75.4 mm (2.97 in); 84.8 mm (3.34 in); 90 mm (3.54 in)
- Cylinder block material: Aluminum die cast
- Cylinder head material: Aluminum die cast
- Valvetrain: Direct acting DOHC, 16 valves, continuously variable MIVEC intake valve timing
- Compression ratio: 10.5:1, 11.0:1

Combustion
- Fuel system: Fuel injection
- Fuel type: Gasoline
- Cooling system: Water cooled

Output
- Power output: 70–86 kW (95–117 PS; 94–115 hp)
- Torque output: 125–154 N⋅m (92–114 lb⋅ft)

Chronology
- Predecessor: Mitsubishi 4G1 engine

The Mitsubishi 4A9 engine is an all-alloy inline four-cylinder engines from Mitsubishi Motors. The engine project was begun as a joint effort by Mitsubishi Motors and DaimlerChrysler (DCX), with Mitsubishi handling the development of the engines and MDC Power GmbH, a company previously jointly established by Mitsubishi and DCX, handling production. It was first introduced in the 2004 Mitsubishi Colt supermini.

The 4A9 is Mitsubishi's first four-cylinder engine family to adopt a high-pressure die-cast aluminum block.

All engines developed within this family have aluminum cylinder block and head, four valves per cylinder, double overhead camshaft layouts, and MIVEC continuous variable valve timing (intake only).

== Production locations ==
The 4A9 engine series was originally built by DaimlerChrysler-owned MDC Power in Germany (previously a joint venture). In addition to MDC Power's original plant in Germany, the 4A9 family has since been produced at multiple sites to supply Mitsubishi's own models and licensed applications by other manufacturers.

Engines for the Japanese market Colt and other Mitsubishi models are produced at Mitsubishi's own powertrain plant in Kyoto, Japan.

In China, the family is built under license at Shenyang Aerospace Mitsubishi Motors Engine Manufacturing Co., Ltd. (SAME), a Mitsubishi joint venture in Shenyang established in 1997, which supplies both Mitsubishi and several Chinese automakers, accounting for most of the engine's applications in domestically produced Chinese vehicles.

In Indonesia, the 4A91 used in the Mitsubishi Xpander was imported from Japan until December 2020, when PT Mitsubishi Motors Krama Yudha Indonesia (MMKI) began local production of the engine at its Cikarang, West Java plant.

== Engine family characteristics ==
For high output and low fuel consumption, the MIVEC system and other measures (including optimized shaping of the intake and exhaust manifolds and cylinder head) were used to promote intake and exhaust efficiency. Optimally shaped cooling passages in the cylinder head and optimal control of the flow of coolant into the cylinder head help to suppress engine knocking. Comprehensive measures to engine components were taken to minimize friction.

For lightness and compactness, design optimization, material optimization, and component integration were identified as effective means of minimizing weight and bulk, so they were comprehensively effected in combination with each other. With regard to materials, the cylinder block is made of aluminum; the cylinder-head cover and intake manifold are made of plastic; the exhaust manifold has a pipe-based structure and cams driven by a timing chain. Component integration was applied in many areas of the engine. Notably, the functions of engine accessories were integrated into the cylinder block.

Exhaust emissions from the engine are minimized by measures including optimal design of the combustion chambers, optimal control of the intake air motion by means of the cylinder-head ports, employment of the MIVEC system, employment of an ultra-thin cylinder head gasket, and employment of micro-droplet fuel injectors. The vehicle's overall exhaust emissions are further suppressed by location of the exhaust manifold at the rear of the engine. This layout is beneficial since it minimizes the heat capacity of the exhaust system upstream of the catalytic converter and thus, together with combustion control, promotes activation of the catalytic converter.

4A91's DOHC camshafts are driven by a single-stage roller chain of 8 mm (0.31 in) pitch and 12.5 mm (0.49 in) width, instead of the previous 4G15's cogged belt drive. Camshafts act directly on bucket-type tappets. The intake camshaft is fitted with a continuously variable cam-phasing, altering timing up to 50 degrees. Valves are inclined at an included angle of 34 degrees versus the 4G15's wider 45 degrees.

== 4A90 ==
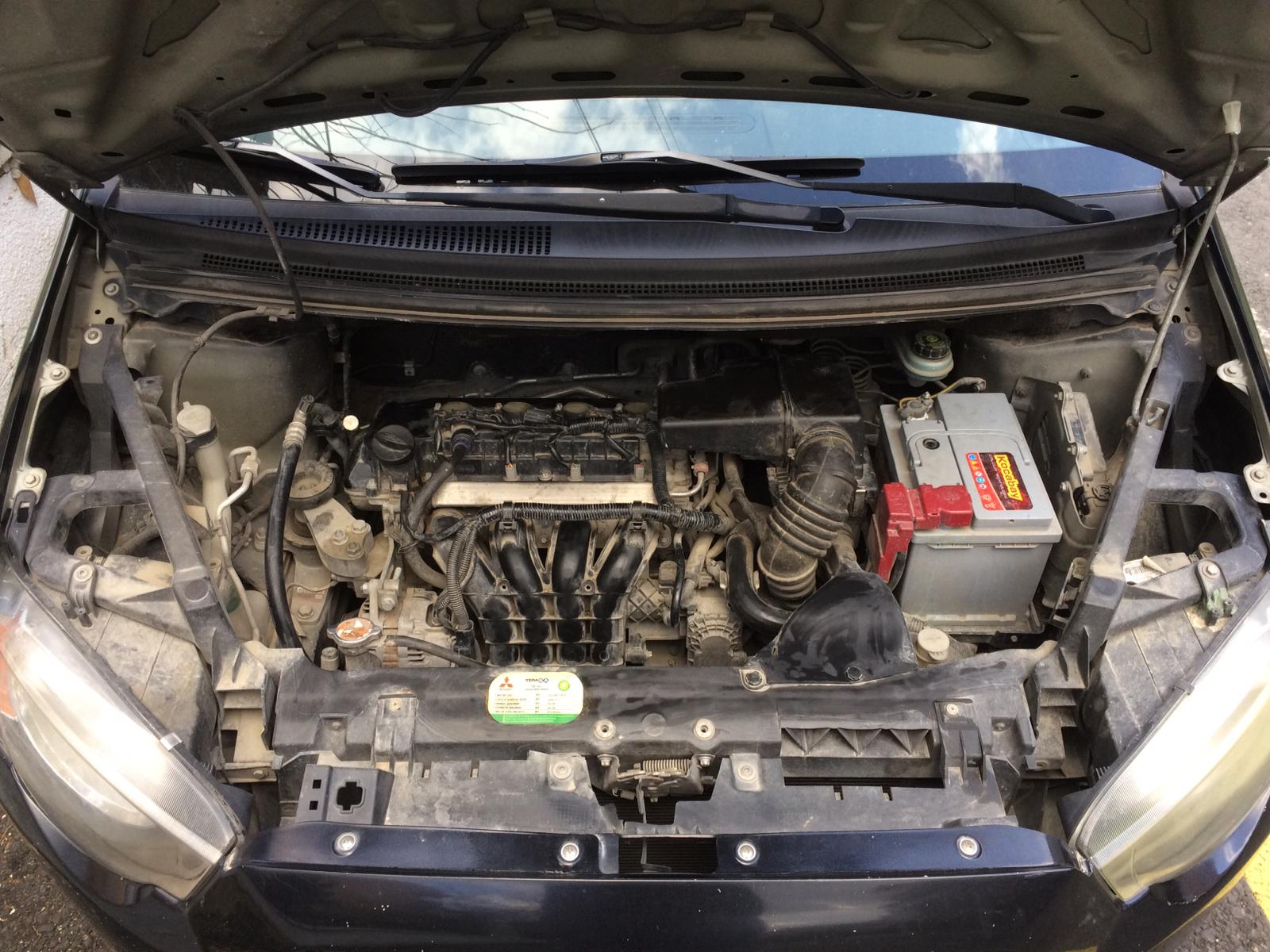
4A90 engine in the 2010 Mitsubishi Colt

=== Specifications ===
Engine type — DOHC 16v, ECI multiple
Displacement — 1.3 L (1,332 cc)
Bore pitch — 83 mm (3.27 in)
Bore — 75 mm (2.95 in)
Stroke — 75.4 mm (2.97 in)
Compression ratio — 10.5:1
Power — 70 kW (95 PS; 94 hp) at 6000 rpm
Torque — 125 N⋅m (92 lb⋅ft) at 4000 rpm

=== Applications ===
- Mitsubishi Colt (2004–2012)
- Smart Forfour (2004–2006; as Mercedes-Benz M135 E13)
- Haima 2 (2011–)
- BAIC Up (2014–)
- DFM Joyear X3 (2016–)
- Zotye Z200 (2011–2015)
- DFM T5 EVO (2023–present)

== 4A91 ==
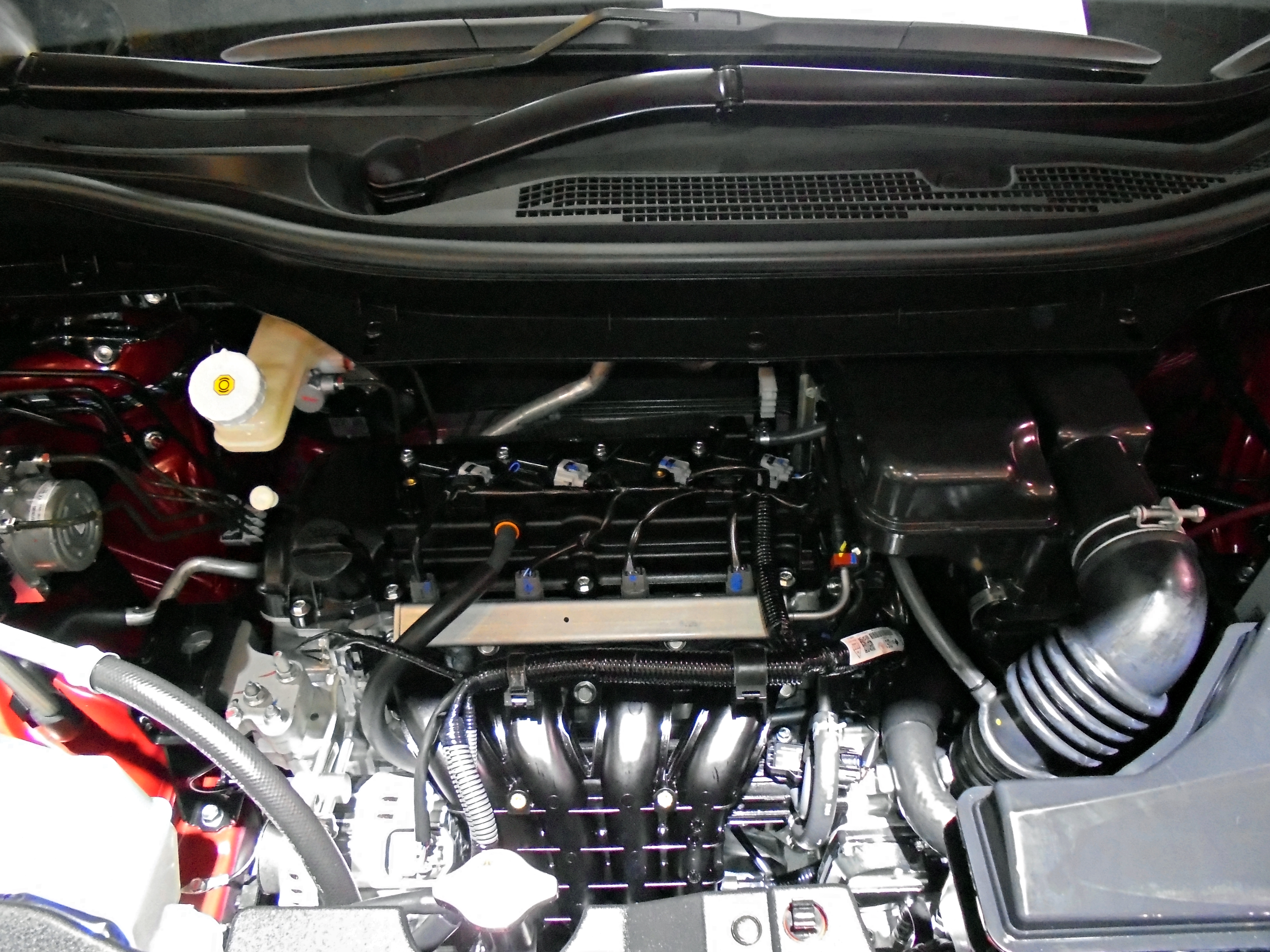
4A91 engine in the 2019 Nissan Livina

=== Specifications ===
Engine type — DOHC 16v, ECI multiple
Displacement — 1.5 L (1,499 cc)
Bore pitch — 83 mm (3.27 in)
Bore — 75 mm (2.95 in)
Stroke — 84.8 mm (3.34 in)
Compression ratio — 10.5:1
Power — 77–81 kW (105–110 PS; 103–109 hp) at 6000 rpm
Torque — 141–145 N⋅m (104–107 lb⋅ft) at 4000 rpm

Output varies by application: Mitsubishi's own Colt and Lancer-era tune produced 81 kW (110 PS; 109 hp) and 145 N⋅m (107 lb⋅ft), while the later tune used in the Xpander and Xforce produces 77 kW (105 PS; 103 hp) and 141 N⋅m (104 lb⋅ft). A turbocharged 4A91T variant, producing around 110 kW (150 PS; 148 hp) and 210 N⋅m (155 lb⋅ft), is also built in China for several licensed applications.

=== Applications ===
- Mitsubishi Colt (2004–)
- Mitsubishi Lancer (2007–)
- Smart Forfour (2004–2006)
- Soueast V3 (2009–2019)
- Brilliance FSV (2010–)
- Haima 2 (2011–)
- Soueast V5 (2012–2020)
- Zotye Z300 (2012–2017; turbo)
- Senova D20 (2012–2020; as A151, a locally-coded variant sharing ignition parts with the 4A9 family)
- Zotye SR7 (2015–2021)
- BAIC BJ20 (2016–2020; turbo)
- Ario S300 (2014–2017; SAIPA's Iranian-market rebadge of the Zotye Z300)
- Brilliance V5 (2017–2020; turbo)
- Senova X55 (2015–2020; turbo)
- Yema T70 SUV (2016–)
- Soueast DX3 (2016–2023; turbo)
- Soueast DX7 (2015–2019; turbo, superseded by the 4A95T from 2020)
- Mitsubishi Xpander (2017–present)
- Nissan Livina (2019–present)
- DFM Joyear S500 (2020–present)
- Mitsubishi Xforce (2023–present)
- Forthing T5 Evo (2023–present; turbo)

== 4A92 ==
=== Specifications ===
Engine type — DOHC 16v, ECI multiple
Displacement — 1,590 cc (1.6 L)
Bore pitch — 83 mm (3.27 in)
Bore — 75 mm (2.95 in)
Stroke — 90 mm (3.54 in)
Compression ratio — 11.0:1
Power — 86 kW (117 PS; 115 hp) at 6000 rpm
Torque — 154 N⋅m (114 lb⋅ft) at 4000 rpm

==== Hybrid variant ====
The 4A92 used in Mitsubishi's e:Motion hybrid system runs the Atkinson cycle at a 14:1 compression ratio, producing 70 kW (95 PS; 94 hp) at 5,100 rpm and 134 N⋅m (99 lb⋅ft) at 4,500 rpm; in this application, the engine acts primarily as a generator for a 116 PS (85 kW)/255 N⋅m electric drive motor, though it can also clutch directly into the drivetrain at higher speeds.

=== Applications ===
- Mitsubishi ASX (2010–; Europe)
- Mitsubishi Lancer (2011–; Europe)
- Brilliance H530 (2011–)
- Brilliance V5 (2011–2020)
- Zotye Z300 (2012–2017; 1.5/1.6L)
- Mitsubishi Lancer (2013–; Philippines)
- DFM Joyear X3 (2017–2018)
- DFM X5 / Farda SX5 (2016–2021)
- DFM SX6 (2024–present)
- Mitsubishi Xpander (HEV) (2024–present)
- Mitsubishi Xforce (HEV) (2025–present)

== See also ==
- List of Mitsubishi engines
