= Mitsubishi Destinator =

Compact crossover SUV

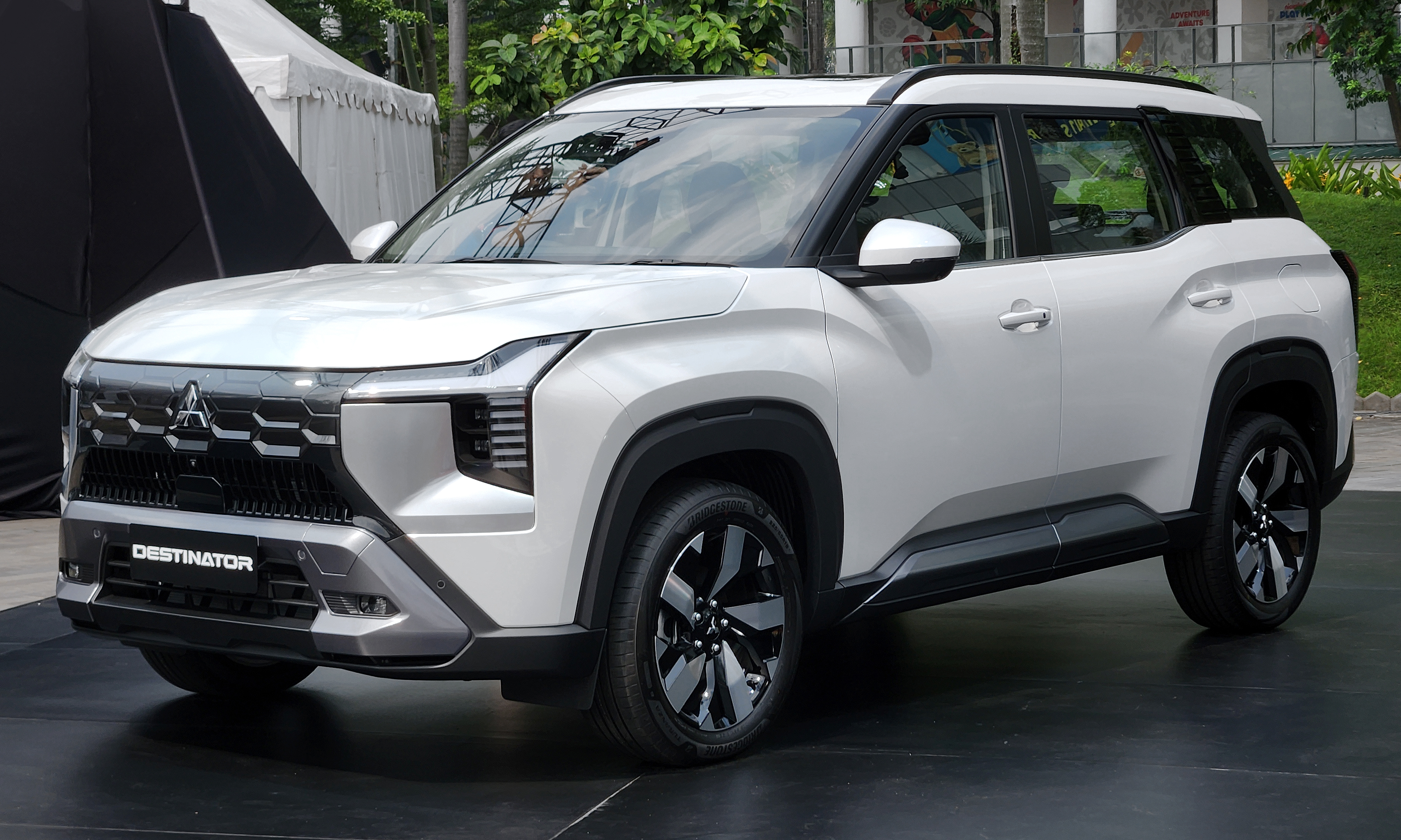
- 2025 Mitsubishi Destinator Ultimate (Indonesia)

Overview
- Manufacturer: Mitsubishi Motors
- Model code: GT1W
- Production: July 2025 – present
- Assembly: Indonesia: Cikarang, West Java (MMKI)
- Designer: Alessandro Dambrosio, Naoki Akita

Body and chassis
- Class: Compact crossover SUV
- Body style: 5-door SUV
- Layout: Front-engine, front-wheel-drive
- Chassis: Unibody
- Related: Mitsubishi Xforce / Outlander Sport; Mitsubishi Xpander

Powertrain
- Engine: Petrol: 1.5 L 4B40 Atkinson cycle turbo I4
- Power output: 120 kW (161 hp; 163 PS)
- Transmission: CVT8

Dimensions
- Wheelbase: 2,815 mm (110.8 in)
- Length: 4,680 mm (184.3 in)
- Width: 1,840 mm (72.4 in)
- Height: 1,780 mm (70.1 in)
- Kerb weight: 1,495 kg (3,296 lb)

Chronology
- Predecessor: Mitsubishi Freeca/Adventure/Kuda/Jolie; Mitsubishi Zinger

The Mitsubishi Destinator is a compact crossover SUV with three-row seating manufactured by Mitsubishi Motors since 2025. It is mainly marketed for emerging markets in Southeast Asia, Latin America, Middle East, South Asia, and Africa.

The Destinator name was chosen for the model "in the hopes that it would empower drivers and their beloved families to pursue new destinations with confidence".

== Overview ==
=== Concept model ===
The DST concept was unveiled on 24 October 2024 at the 2024 Philippines International Motor Show. The exterior of the DST Concept features the Dynamic Shield grille with a honeycomb pattern, vents on the bonnet, the front LED daytime running lights and taillights are of a T-shaped design, a high ground clearance, sculpted fenders with large diameter wheels and blacked out pillars. Inside, the DST Concept features a flat dashboard design with large screens for the instrument cluster and infotainment system, and a panoramic sunroof.

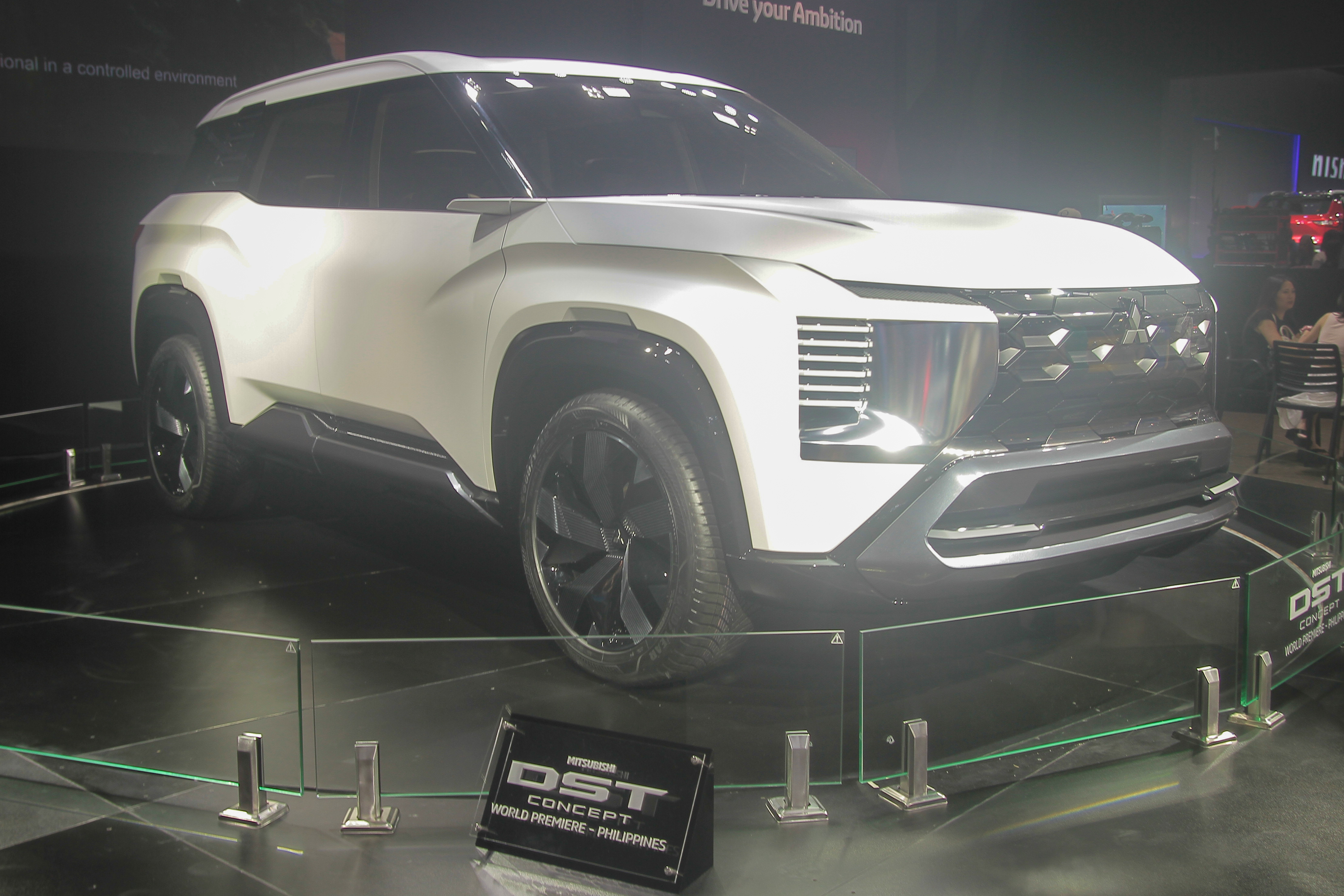
Mitsubishi DST Concept, which previewed the Destinator

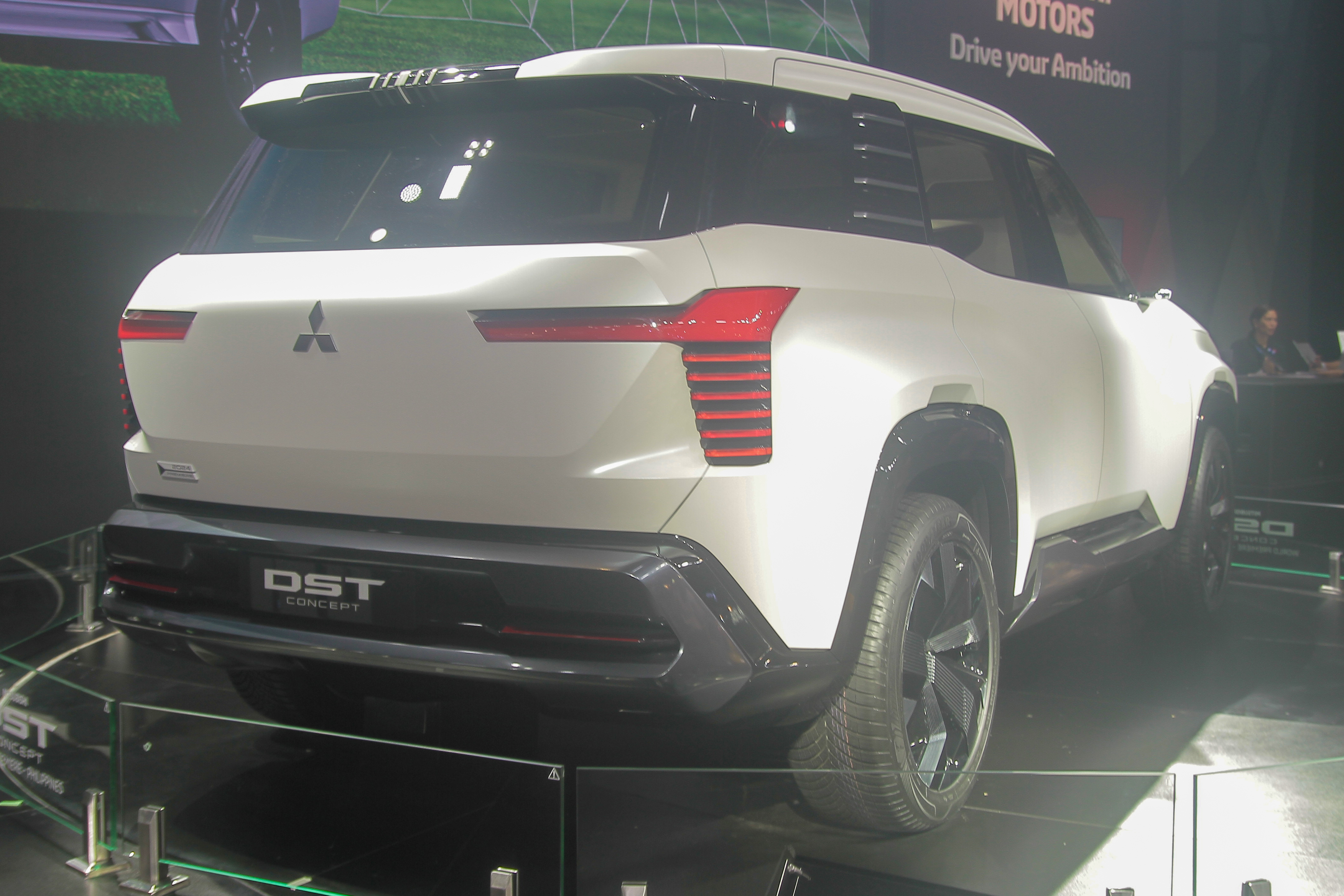
Rear view

=== Production model ===
The Destinator was officially unveiled on 17 July 2025 in Jakarta, Indonesia and was the third strategic model from Mitsubishi to be launched in Indonesia, after the Xpander and Xforce.

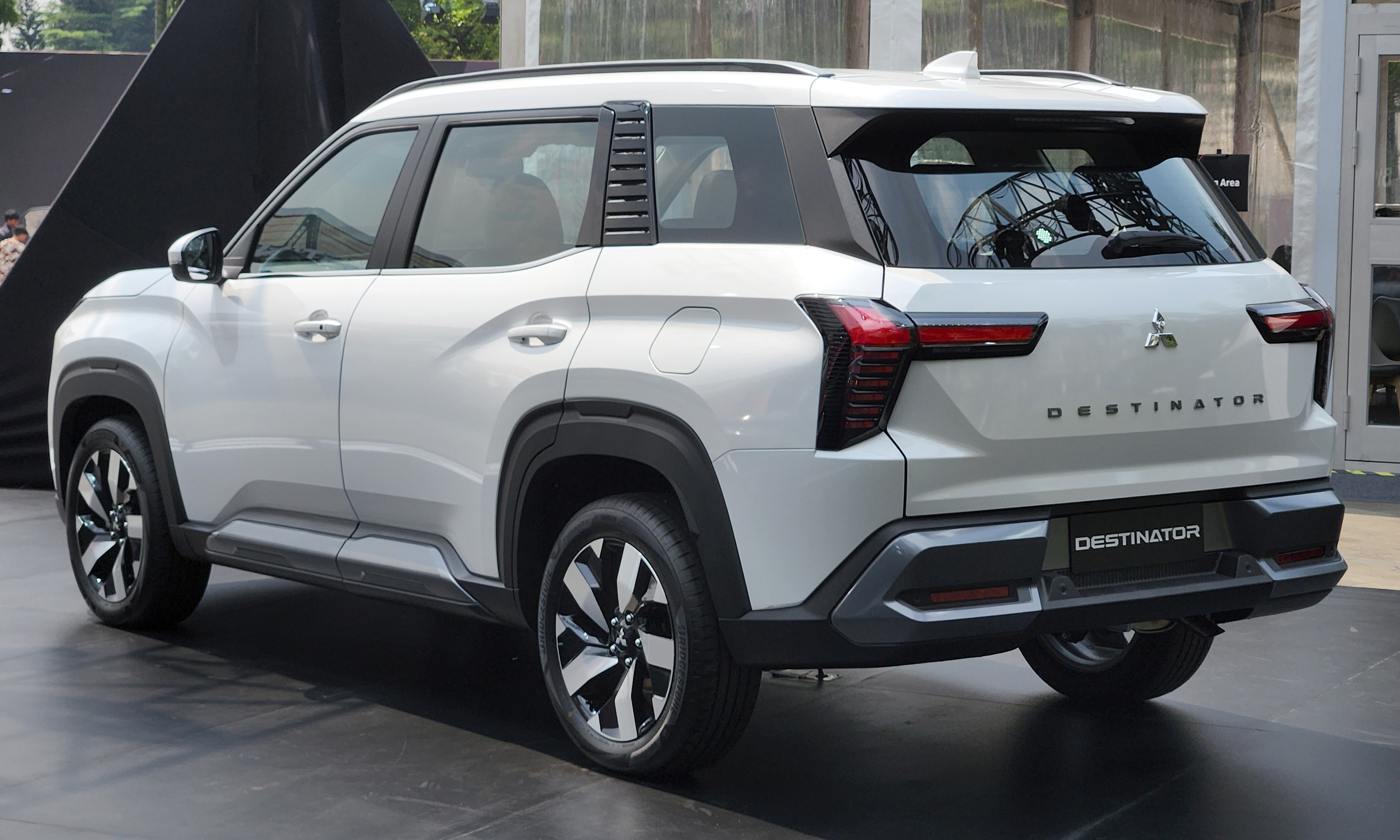
Rear view

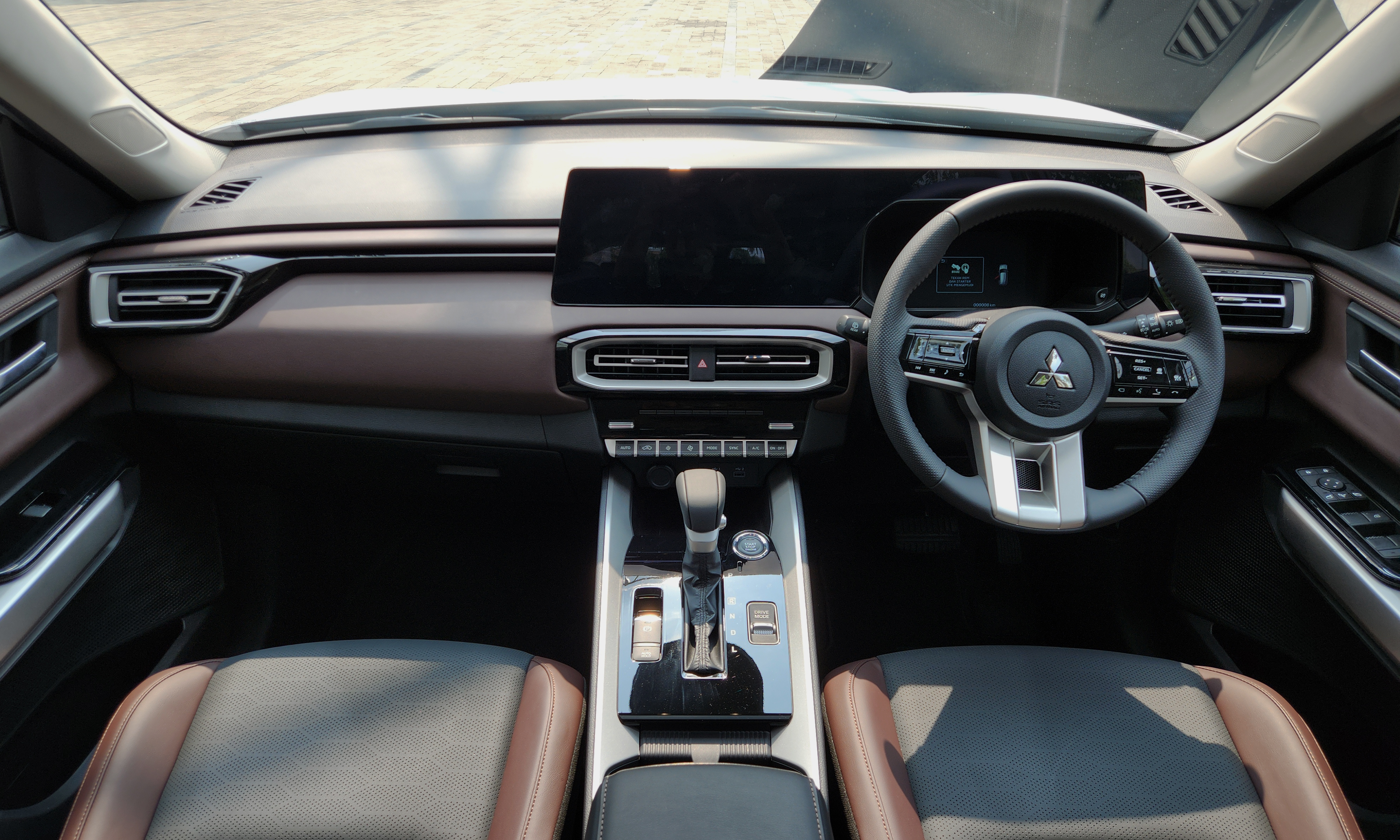
Interior

==== Exterior ====
The Destinator was created under the design concept "Gravitas and Dynamism" and its design is similar to the Xforce, particularly the Dynamic Shield front fascia, and has retained most of the design elements from the DST Concept for the production model. The front fascia features a honeycombed pattern acrylic grille design. The side features 18-inch alloy wheels, blacked out pillars, and the C-pillar with a decorative trim piece. The rear fascia features the Hexaguard Horizon concept (used in the Xforce), a hexagonal motif design inspired by the spare tyres on the tailgate of the Pajero. The headlights and taillights are of a T-shaped design.

==== Interior ====
The interior of the Destinator shares the similar layout to the Xforce. There is an 8-inch digital instrument cluster and 12.3-inch Smart-link Display Audio touchscreen infotainment system, 64-colour customisable ambient lighting, dual-zone automatic climate control with ceiling-mounted vents, Dynamic Sound Yamaha Premium sound system and a panoramic sunroof. The entry-level variants features a 4.2-inch MID display and analogue dials for the instrument cluster, and a smaller 8-inch display for the touchscreen infotainment system.

The second row seats split fold in a 40/20/40 format, while the third row split fold in a 50/50 format. In the second and third-row seating, there are seatback table trays, seatback storage pockets and under seat storage trays.

==== Drivetrain ====
The Destinator is powered by the 1.5-litre 4B40 MIVEC turbocharged petrol engine produces 120 kW (161 hp; 163 PS), it features an Atkinson combustion cycle and a water-cooled intercooler. The engine is paired to a continuously variable transmission through a front-wheel drive system. The Destinator is equipped with the Active Yaw Control system and five selectable drive modes.

For the suspension, MacPherson struts used for the front and a torsion beam setup used for the rear. The suspension was heavily retuned to suit the road conditions of Southeast Asian countries. Disc brakes are used for both the front and rear braking system. The Destinator has a ground clearance of 244 mm (9.6 in) (without the undercover), 21° approach, 20.8° breakover, and 25.5° departure angles.

== Markets ==
=== Brunei ===
The Destinator was launched in Brunei on 20 December 2025, with only available in sole unnamed variant.

=== Indonesia ===
The Destinator went on sale in Indonesia on 23 July 2025 at the 32nd Gaikindo Indonesia International Auto Show, with three trim levels: GLS, Exceed and Ultimate. The Ultimate trim is available with Premium package which adds on features such as the Dynamic Sound Yamaha Premium sound system, a hands-free powered liftgate and powered front seats.

=== Middle East ===
The Destinator was officially unveiled in the Middle East in the United Arab Emirates on 30 January 2026, followed by launches in Oman on 10 February 2026 and Bahrain on 19 February 2026.

=== Philippines ===
The Destinator was launched in the Philippines on 20 November 2025, with three trim levels: GLX, GLS and GT.

=== South Africa ===
The Destinator went on sale in South Africa on 17 March 2026, with two trim levels: GLS and Exceed.

=== Vietnam ===
The Destinator was launched in Vietnam on 1 December 2025, with two variants: Premium and Ultimate.

== Safety ==
For safety, the Destinator comes standard with six SRS airbags. The Destinator is also available with the Mitsubishi Motors Safety Sensing (also known as 'Diamond Sense' in Indonesia) advanced driver-assistance systems with features such as Adaptive Cruise Control (ACC), Automatic High Beam (AHB), Blind Spot Warning (BSW), Forward Collision Mitigation System (FCM), Leading Car Departure Notification (LCDN), Multi Around Monitor and Rear Cross Traffic Alert (RCTA).

In October 2025, the Destinator was tested for automotive safety by ASEAN NCAP. It received five stars out of a possible five.

ASEAN NCAP test results Mitsubishi Destinator (2025)
| Test | Points |
|---|---|
| Overall: | 5 /5 stars |
| Adult occupant: | 34.69 |
| Child occupant: | 16.54 |
| Safety assist: | 15.02 |
| Motorcyclist Safety: | 11.02 |

== Sales ==
| Year | Indonesia | Philippines |
|---|---|---|
| 2025 | 10,415 | 1,352 |
