= Mitsubishi Xforce =

Subcompact crossover SUV

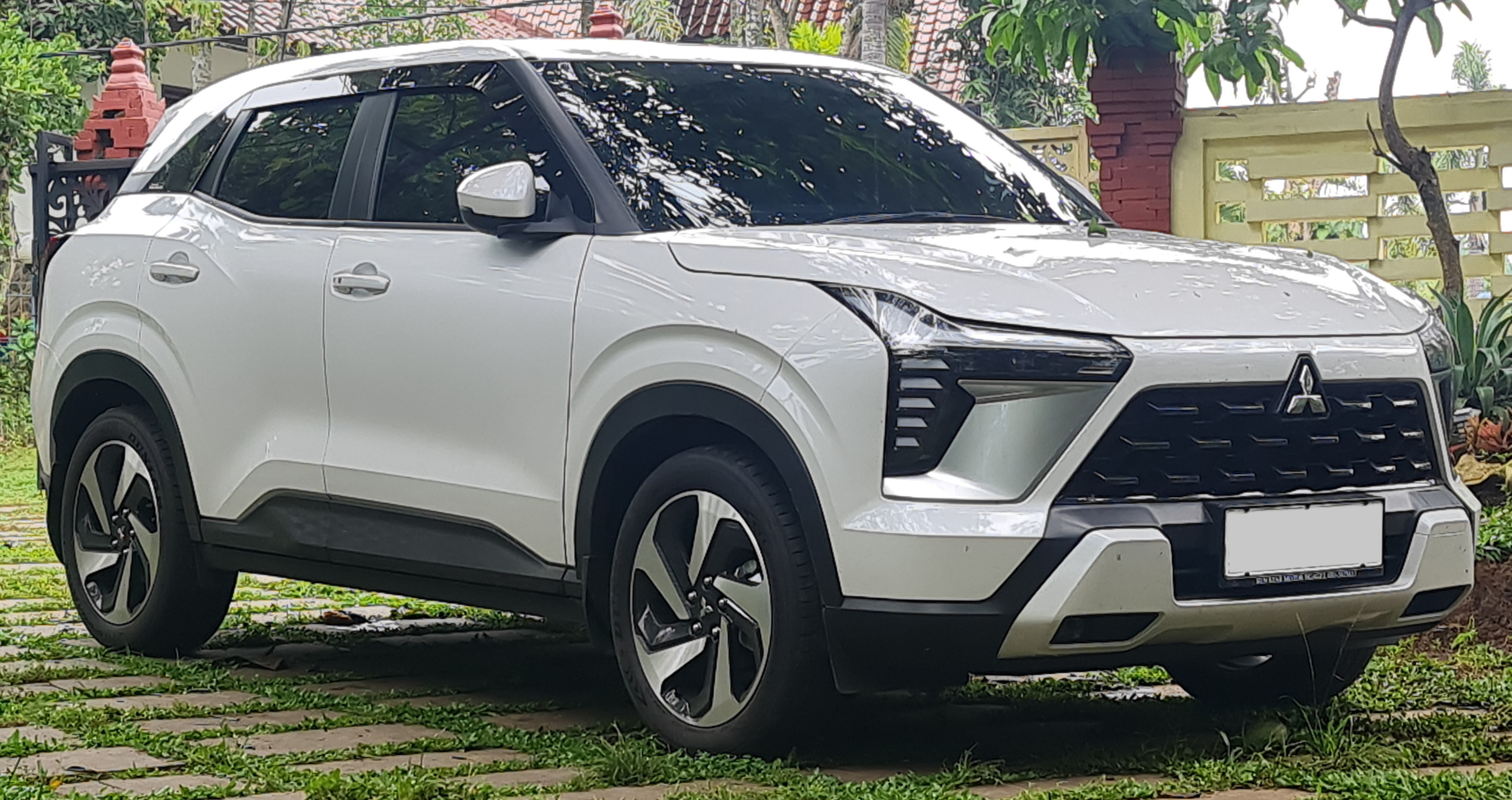
- 2024 Mitsubishi Xforce Ultimate (Indonesia)

Overview
- Manufacturer: Mitsubishi Motors
- Model code: GR1W (1.5 L); GE2W (1.6 L hybrid)
- Also called: Mitsubishi Outlander Sport (Americas, Africa and New Zealand)
- Production: October 2023 – present
- Assembly: Indonesia: Cikarang, West Java (MMKI); Thailand: Laem Chabang (MMTh, HEV); Malaysia: Pekan, Pahang (HICOM); Taiwan: Taoyuan (CMC)
- Designer: Alessandro D'ambrosio (executive design director)

Body and chassis
- Class: Subcompact SUV (B-segment)
- Body style: 5-door crossover SUV
- Layout: Front-engine, front-wheel-drive
- Related: Mitsubishi Destinator; Mitsubishi Xpander

Powertrain
- Engine: Petrol: 1.5 L 4A91 MIVEC I4; Petrol hybrid: 1.6 L 4A92 MIVEC I4
- Power output: 77 kW (103 hp; 105 PS); 85 kW (114 hp; 116 PS) (HEV, combined system output)
- Transmission: CVT
- Hybrid drivetrain: Power-split (HEV)

Dimensions
- Wheelbase: 2,650 mm (104.3 in)
- Length: 4,390 mm (172.8 in)
- Width: 1,810 mm (71.3 in)
- Height: 1,660 mm (65.4 in)
- Curb weight: 1,245 kg (2,745 lb)

Chronology
- Predecessor: Mitsubishi ASX / Outlander Sport

The Mitsubishi Xforce (alternatively spelled XFORCE) is a subcompact SUV (B-segment) manufactured by Mitsubishi Motors since 2023. In some markets such as the Americas, Africa, and New Zealand, it is marketed as the Mitsubishi Outlander Sport.

The Xforce was first shown as a concept car, named the XFC Concept, on 19 October in Ho Chi Minh City, and then on 26 October at the 2022 Vietnam Motor Show. The production version was unveiled at the 30th Gaikindo Indonesia International Auto Show on 10 August 2023.

== Overview ==
Built on the same platform as the Xpander MPV, the Xforce uses an updated Mitsubishi Motors design language up front, being the latest evolution of the 'Dynamic Shield' theme. According to Mitsubishi Motors, Xforce is specifically tuned to offer heightened ride comfort on Southeast Asian roads, using a larger caster trail and quicker OA gear ratio in the front suspension, along with bigger-diameter rear shock absorbers. Active Yaw Control (AYC) is standard. The Xforce offers four driving modes depending on variant: Normal, Wet, Gravel and Mud. The 'Wet' mode is the first for a Mitsubishi Motors model.

Production of the Xforce started in October 2023 at MMKI plant in Cikarang, West Java, with first batch of the vehicle being handed to customers on 19 November 2023. Exports were commenced on 11 February 2024 to neighboring ASEAN countries, followed by other markets such as South Asia, Middle East, Africa and Latin America.

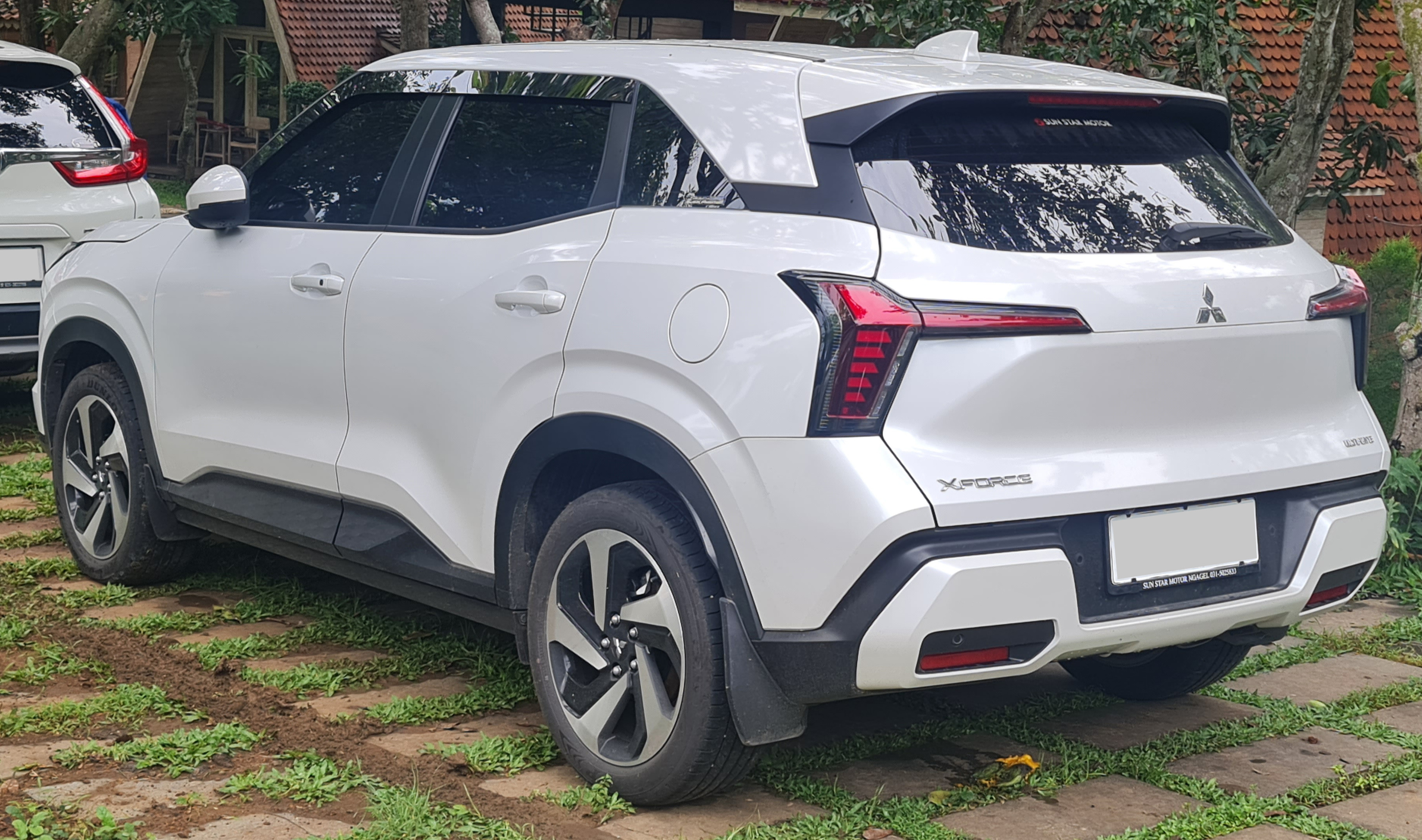
Rear view

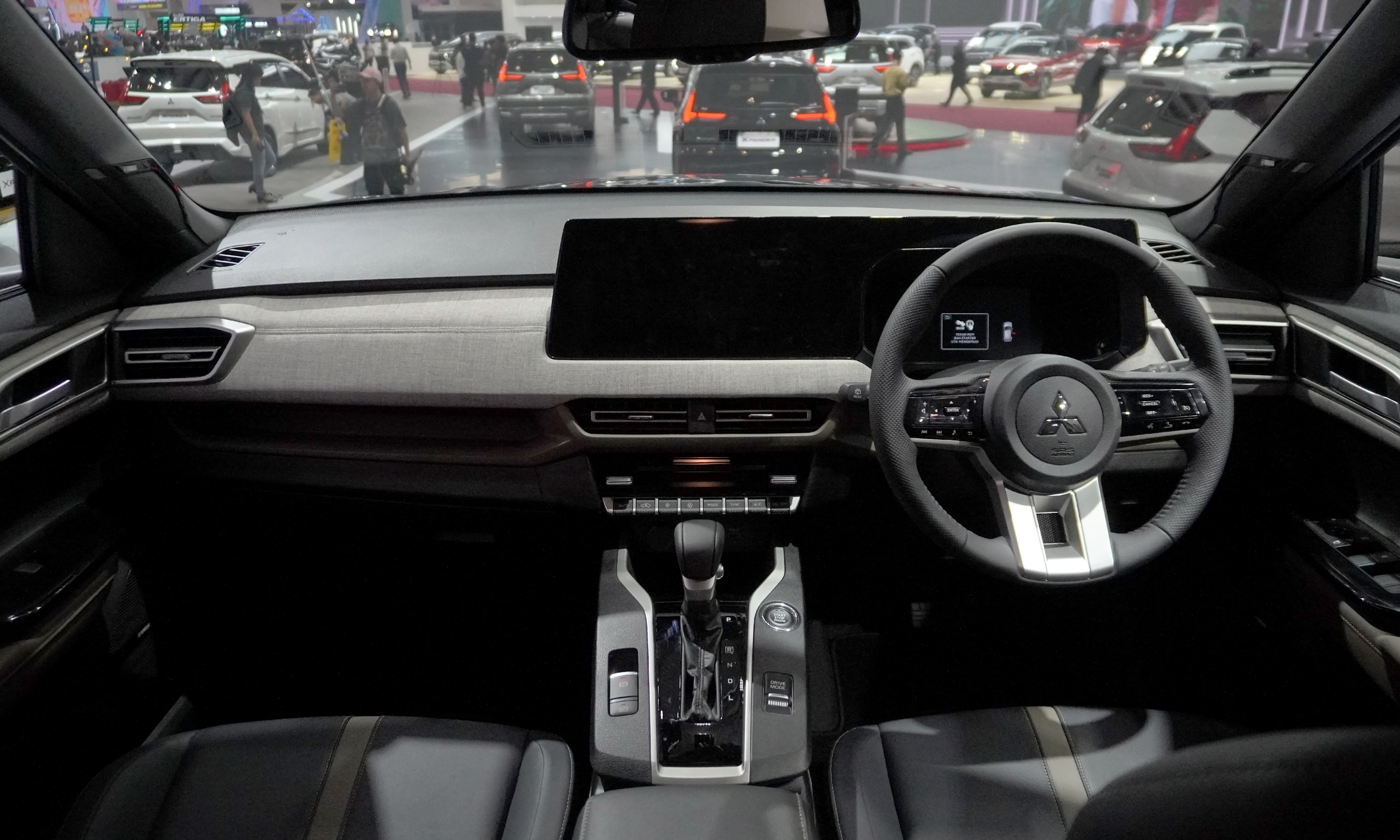
Interior

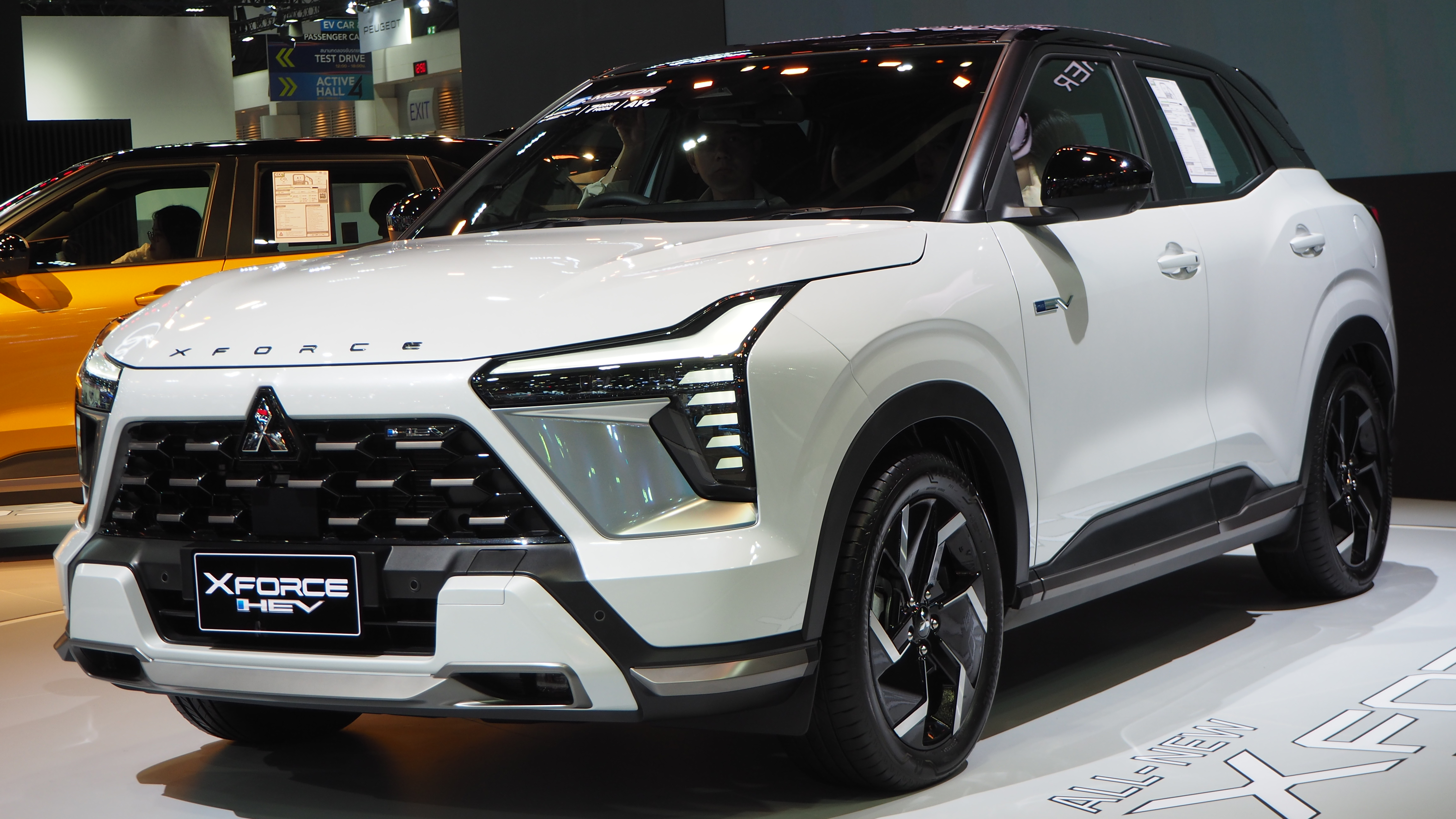
Xforce HEV

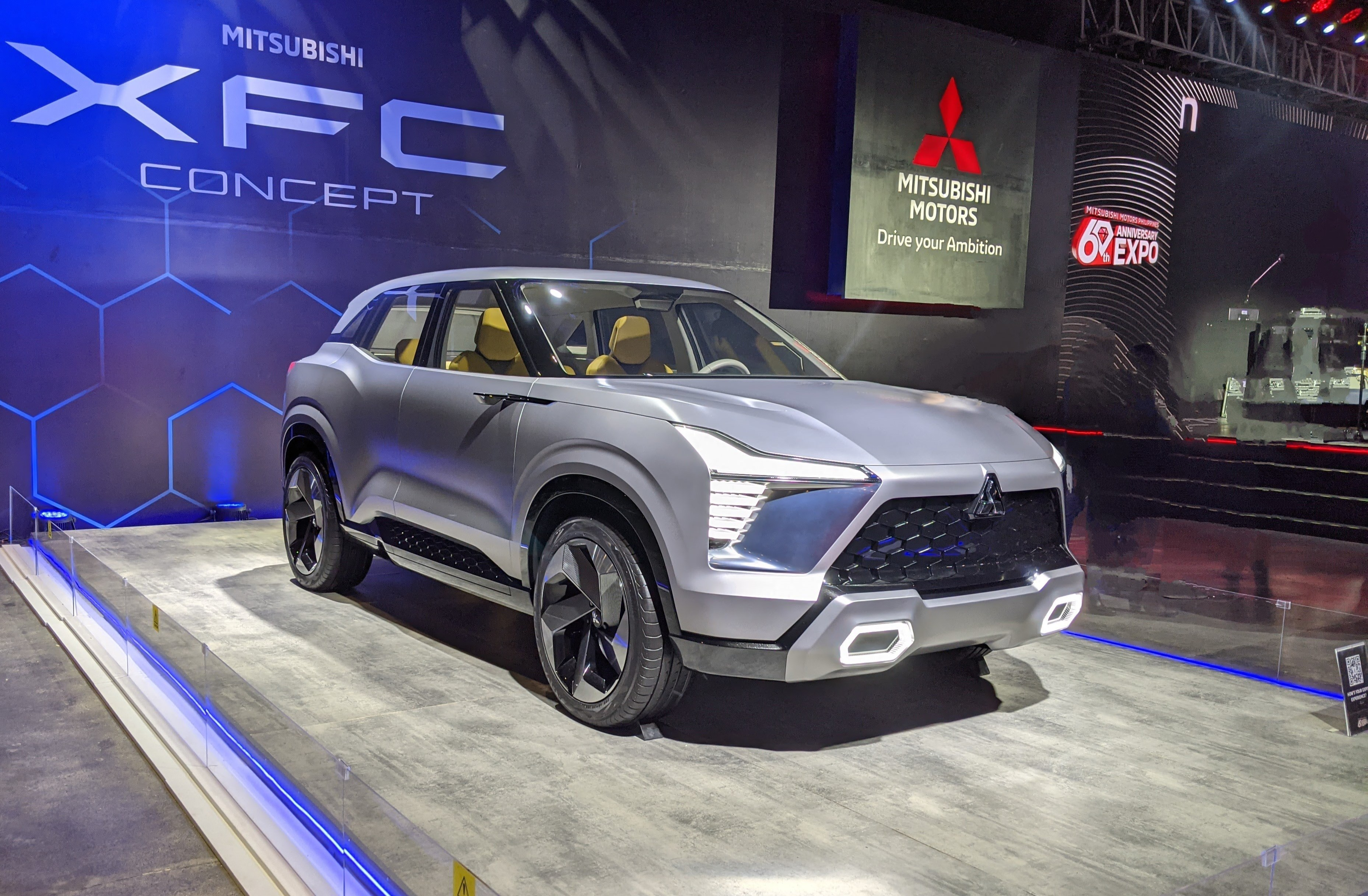
Mitsubishi XFC Concept, which previewed the Xforce

== Engines ==
Type	Model	Engine	Transmission	Power	Torque
Petrol	1.5	1,499 cc 4A91 DOHC 16-valve MIVEC straight-four	Aisin Continuously variable transmission cvt for non hybrid, and series-parallel transmission for hybrid	77 kW (103 hp; 105 PS) at 6,000 rpm	141 N⋅m (104 lb⋅ft) at 4,000 rpm
Petrol hybrid	1.6	1,590 cc 4A92 DOHC 16-valve MIVEC straight-four	Aisin Continuously variable transmission cvt for non hybrid, and series-parallel transmission for hybrid	Engine: 79 kW (106 hp; 107 PS) at 6,000 rpm Motor: 85 kW (114 hp; 116 PS)	Engine: 134 N⋅m (99 lb⋅ft) at 4,500 rpm Motor: 255 N⋅m (188 lb⋅ft)

== Markets ==
=== Africa ===
==== Egypt ====
On 10 June 2024, local distributor Diamond Motors launched the vehicle in Egypt as the Outlander Sport.

==== South Africa ====
The vehicle went on sale as the Outlander Sport in South Africa on 27 January 2025. It is available in four trim levels, namely GL, GLS, Aspire and Exceed.

==== Morocco ====
The Outlander Sport was launched in Morocco by Auto Hall group on 30 September 2026. with a starting price of 219;000 DH.

=== Americas ===
==== Costa Rica ====
The vehicle went on sale in Costa Rica in April 2024 as the Outlander Sport. It is available in three variants, namely GLS, GLS+ and GT.

==== Mexico ====
The vehicle went on sale in Mexico in August 2024 as the Outlander Sport. It is available in two variants, namely SE and SE Plus.

=== Asia ===
==== Brunei ====
The Xforce was launched in Brunei on 12 July 2024 and the car were offered in a single variant. ADAS is available as standard equipment.

==== Indonesia ====
The Indonesian market Xforce is offered in two trim levels: Exceed and Ultimate, both are only paired to a CVT transmission. The Ultimate with Diamond Sense (DS) variant was introduced in November 2024, which saw the inclusion of ADAS features, dual-tone exterior colour, a mono camera both front and rear, and two extra airbags. In July 2026, the hybrid electric powertrain (HEV) was introduced in Indonesia as the flagship variant and also available with the Premium package.

==== Malaysia ====
The Xforce was launched in Malaysia on 8 April 2026. Locally assembled in Pekan, Pahang, it is available with two trim levels: Urban, and Ultimate.

==== Philippines ====
The Xforce was launched in the Philippines on 28 June 2024 and sales commenced on 5 July 2024. It is available in two trim levels: GLS and GT, the latter trim is available with ADAS as standard equipment.

In June 2026, the GLX trim was added to the lineup.

==== Taiwan ====
The Xforce was launched in Taiwan on 3 November 2025 and sales commenced on 30 December 2025 at the Taipei New Car and New Energy Vehicles Motor Show. Built and assembled at China Motor Corporation, it is available with three variants: Enjoy Edition, Cool Edition and Binge Edition, both variants are equipped with ADAS as standard equipment.

==== Thailand ====
The Xforce was launched in Thailand on 20 March 2025, debuted with the hybrid electric powertrain marketed as the HEV, are built and assembled by Mitsubishi Motors Thailand (MMTh). It is available with three trim levels: Ignite, Ultimate and Ultimate X.

==== Vietnam ====
The Xforce was launched in Vietnam on 10 January 2024. It is available with four trim levels: GLX, Exceed, Premium and Ultimate, the latter trim is available with ADAS as standard equipment.

=== Middle East ===
The Mitsubishi X-Force was officially unveiled in the Middle East by Mitsubishi Motors Middle East & Africa in 2024, with regional launches in Kuwait, Qatar, Bahrain, and Oman; it is also marketed as the Mitsubishi Outlander Sport in markets including Egypt, Jordan, and Lebanon.

=== Oceania ===
==== New Zealand ====
The vehicle was unveiled in New Zealand as the Outlander Sport HEV on 12 May 2026.

== Safety ==
ASEAN NCAP test results Mitsubishi Xforce (2024)
Test	Points
Overall:	5 /5 stars
Adult occupant:	35.13
Child occupant:	17.03
Safety assist:	14.65
Motorcyclist Safety:	12.35

== Awards ==
The Xforce has won the "Good Design Award 2023" from the Japan Institute of Design Promotion, and the gold award under "Best Transportation Design" category from VMARK Vietnam Design Award 2023.

== Sales ==
Year	Indonesia	Vietnam
2023	2,723	
2024	6,517	14,407
2025	3,688	15,254
