= Vietnam Motor Show =

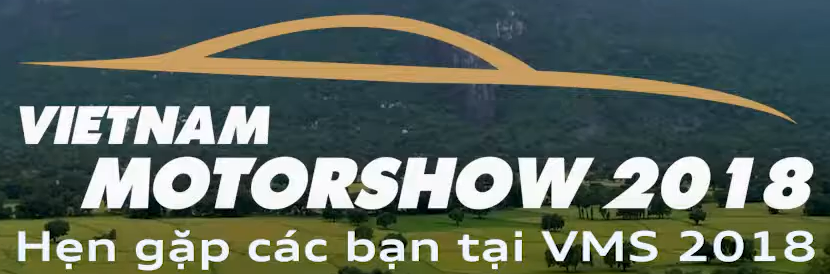
- Logo of the 2018 Vietnam Motor Show
- Genre: Auto show
- Frequency: Annual
- Location: Ho Chi Minh City
- Country: Vietnam
- Inaugurated: 2004
- Website: www.vietnammotorshow.vn

The Vietnam Motor Show is an international auto show that will return in October 2022 after a two-year absence due to the COVID-19 pandemic.

== Editions ==
- 2004 Vietnam Motor Show
- 2005 Vietnam Motor Show
- 2006 Vietnam Motor Show
- 2007 Vietnam Motor Show
- 2008 Vietnam Motor Show
- 2009 Vietnam Motor Show
- 2010 Vietnam Motor Show
- 2011 Vietnam Motor Show
- 2012 Vietnam Motor Show
- 2013 Vietnam Motor Show
- 2014 Vietnam Motor Show
- 2015 Vietnam Motor Show
- 2016 Vietnam Motor Show
- 2017 Vietnam Motor Show
- 2018 Vietnam Motor Show
- 2019 Vietnam Motor Show

There was no "Vietnam Motor Show" in 2020 and 2021 due to the COVID-19 pandemic

=== 2022 ===
- 2022 Vietnam Motor Show

The 2022 edition took place between October 26–30, with 14 car brands confirming their presence at the event: Audi, Brabus, Honda, Jeep, Lexus, Mercedes-Benz, Mitsubishi Motors, Morgan, MG, RAM, Subaru, Toyota, Volkswagen and Volvo.

In addition, the 2022 Vietnam Motor Show marked the first participation of other means of transport, including trucks, heavy-duty vehicles and electric cars.

==== Concept cars ====
- Mitsubishi XFC Concept

=== 2024-present ===
- 2024 Vietnam Motor Show
- 2026 Vietnam Motor Show

== Exhibition ==
The show will be held at the Saigon Exhibition and Convention Center in Ho Chi Minh City.
