= Mitsubishi 4B4 engine =

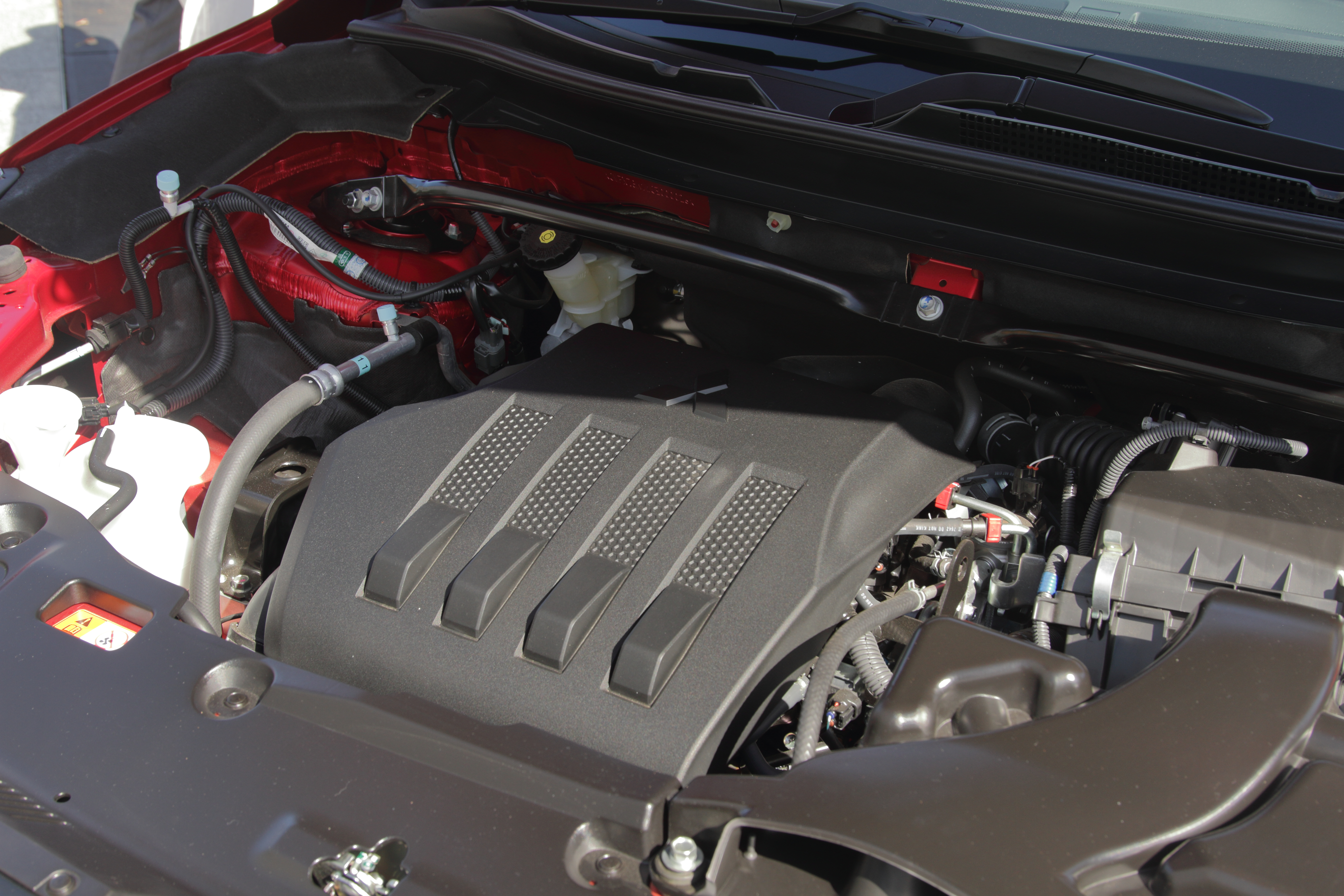

Overview
- Manufacturer: Mitsubishi Motors
- Production: 2017–present

Layout
- Configuration: 4-cylinder
- Displacement: 1.5 L (1,499 cc)
- Cylinder bore: 75 mm (2.95 in)
- Piston stroke: 84.8 mm (3.34 in)
- Cylinder block material: Aluminum die cast
- Cylinder head material: Aluminum die cast
- Valvetrain: Direct acting DOHC, 16 valves, continuously variable MIVEC intake valve timing
- Compression ratio: 10.0:1

Combustion
- Turbocharger: with intercooler
- Fuel system: Direct injection
- Fuel type: Gasoline
- Cooling system: Water-cooled

Output
- Power output: 120 kW (161 hp)
- Specific power: 80.1 kW (107.4 hp) per litre
- Torque output: 250 N⋅m (184 lb⋅ft)

Chronology
- Predecessor: Mitsubishi 4B11T engine (2.0L Turbo)

The Mitsubishi 4B4 engine is a turbocharged, all-alloy inline four-cylinder engine from Mitsubishi Motors, derived from the 4A9 engine introduced in 2004. Although smaller than the 4B1 engine it succeeds, the 4B4 is intended to match its performance.

== Engine family characteristics ==
The engine was developed to meet new performance, weight, and emissions standards, and is derived from the earlier 4A91 engine. It is used mainly in compact and mid-size crossover SUVs. Peak torque is delivered from 1,800 to 4,500 rpm.

== 4B40 ==
=== Specifications ===
Engine type	Inline turbo/intercooled 4-cylinder DOHC 16v MIVEC
Displacement	1.5 L
Bore x Stroke	75 mm × 84.8 mm (2.95 in × 3.34 in)
Compression ratio	10.0:1
Fuel system	Direct injection (high-pressure) combined with port injection (low-pressure); both fuel rails are returnless, with the high-pressure rail fitted with a pressure sensor.
Peak power	120 kW (161 hp) at 5500 rpm
Peak torque	250 N⋅m (184 lb⋅ft) at 1800 to 4500 rpm

=== Applications ===
- 2017–present Mitsubishi Eclipse Cross
- 2023–present Mitsubishi Outlander (with mild hybrid)
- 2025–present Mitsubishi Destinator

== See also ==
- List of Mitsubishi engines
