= Mitsubishi Outlander Sport =

Automotive nameplate by Mitsubishi Motors

The Mitsubishi Outlander Sport is an automobile nameplate used by the Japanese automobile manufacturer Mitsubishi Motors since 2010 for several subcompact crossover SUV models:

- Mitsubishi ASX, marketed as the Outlander Sport in the United States, Argentina, Brazil, and Indonesia since 2010
- Mitsubishi Xforce, marketed as the Outlander Sport in the Americas, Africa, and New Zealand since 2023
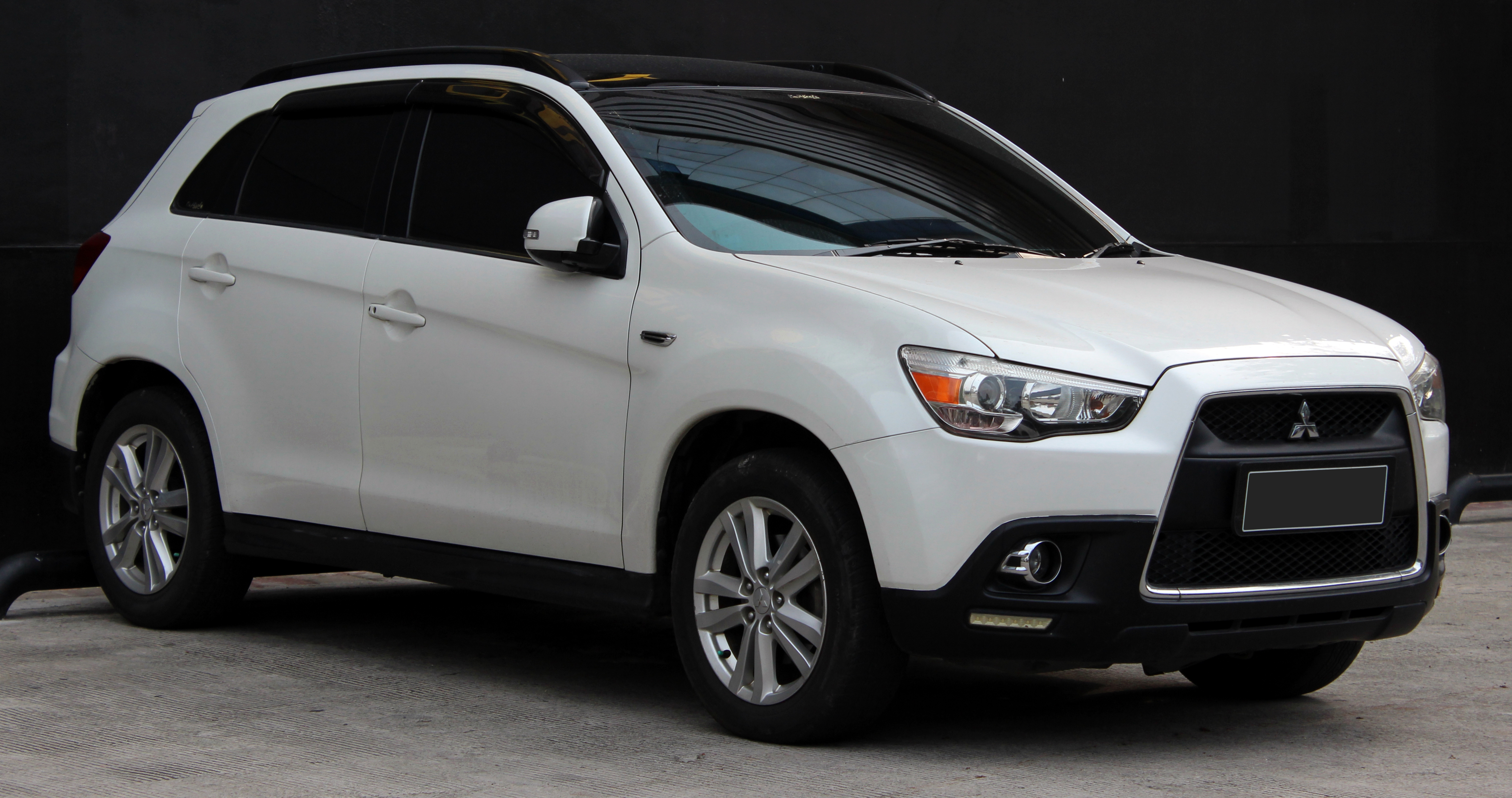
Mitsubishi Outlander Sport (ASX-based model)

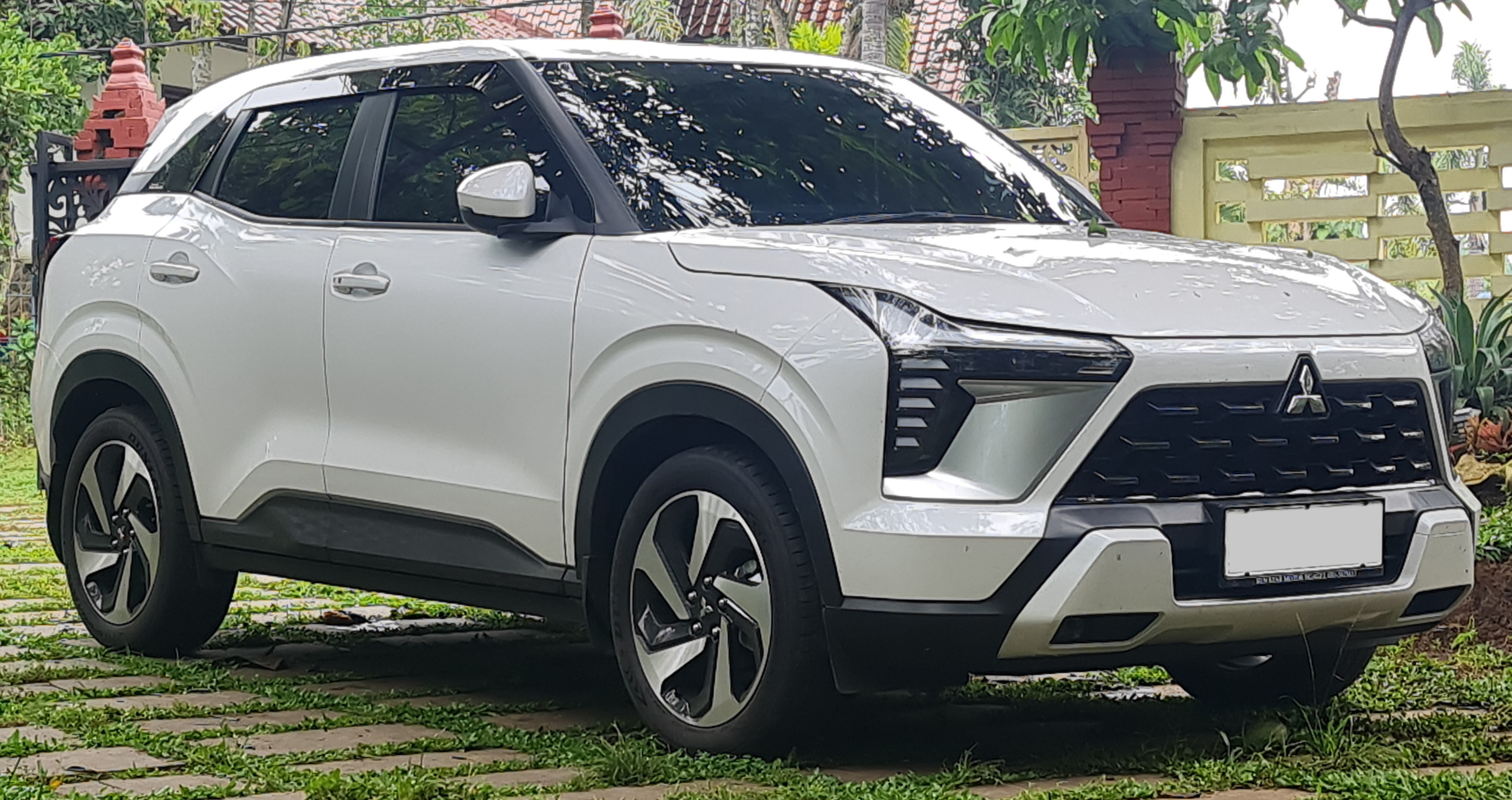
Mitsubishi Outlander Sport (Xforce-based model)
