= Mitsubishi Eclipse Cross =

Compact crossover SUV

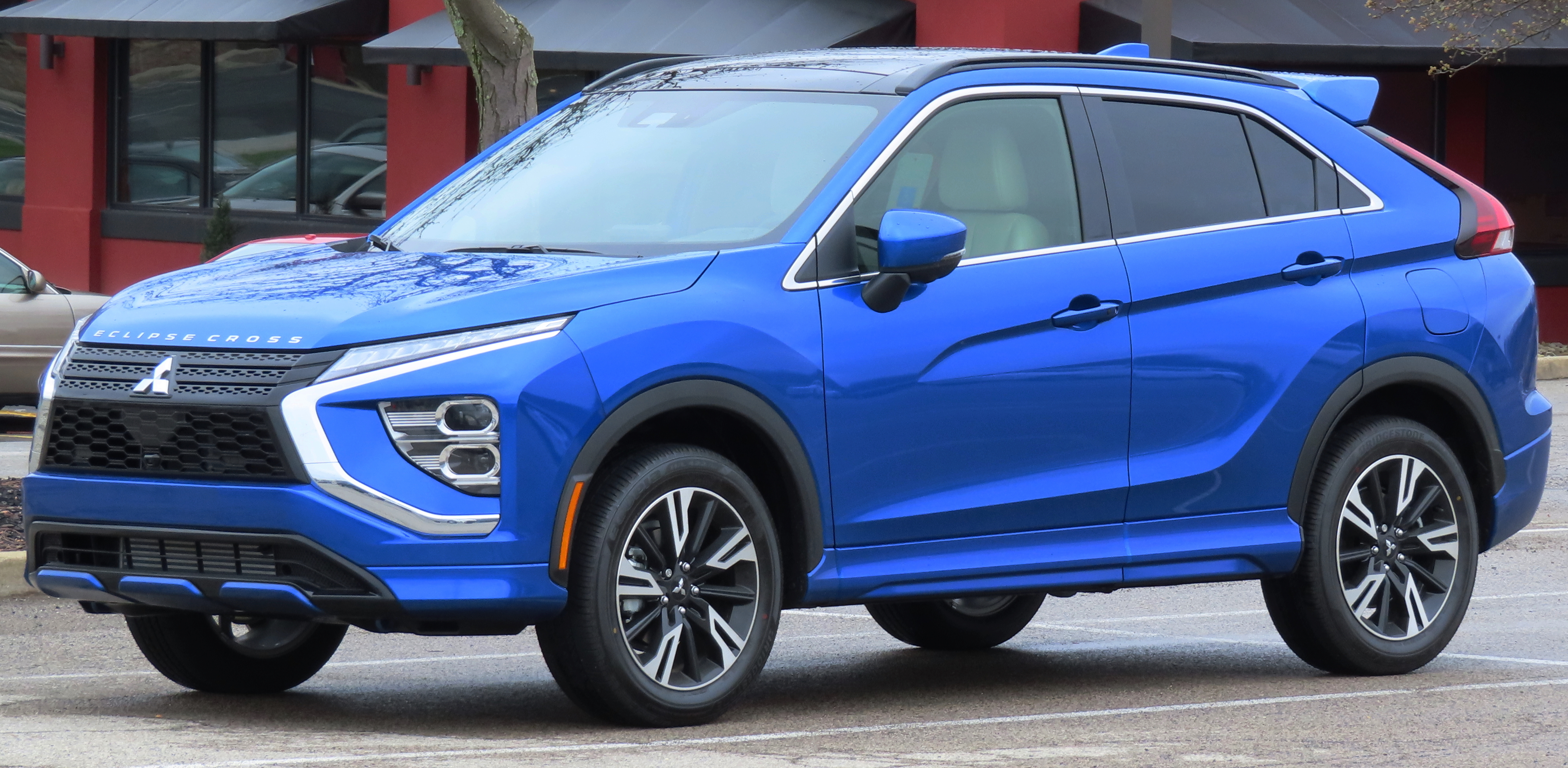
- 2023 Mitsubishi Eclipse Cross SEL Touring (US)

Overview
- Manufacturer: Mitsubishi Motors
- Production: October 2017 – present
- Model years: 2018–present

Body and chassis
- Class: Compact crossover SUV (C)
- Body style: 5-door SUV

The Mitsubishi Eclipse Cross (Japanese: 三菱・エクリプスクロス, Hepburn: Mitsubishi Ekuripusu Kurosu) is a compact crossover SUV produced by Japanese carmaker Mitsubishi Motors. It slots between the RVR/ASX/Outlander Sport and Outlander in Mitsubishi's global crossover lineup. The first-generation model has been produced since October 2017. Since 2025, the second-generation model has been sold exclusively in Europe as a battery electric model based on the Renault Scénic E-Tech.

The 'Eclipse Cross' name originates from the unrelated compact sports car, the Eclipse. Unlike the original Eclipse, however, the Eclipse Cross is not assembled in the United States as Mitsubishi closed its Diamond-Star Motors plant in Normal, Illinois in February 2016 and sold the plant to electric vehicle startup Rivian in January 2017. Instead, the first generation of the SUV is assembled in Japan, China, and Brazil.

== First generation (GK/GL/YA/YB; 2017) ==
First generation
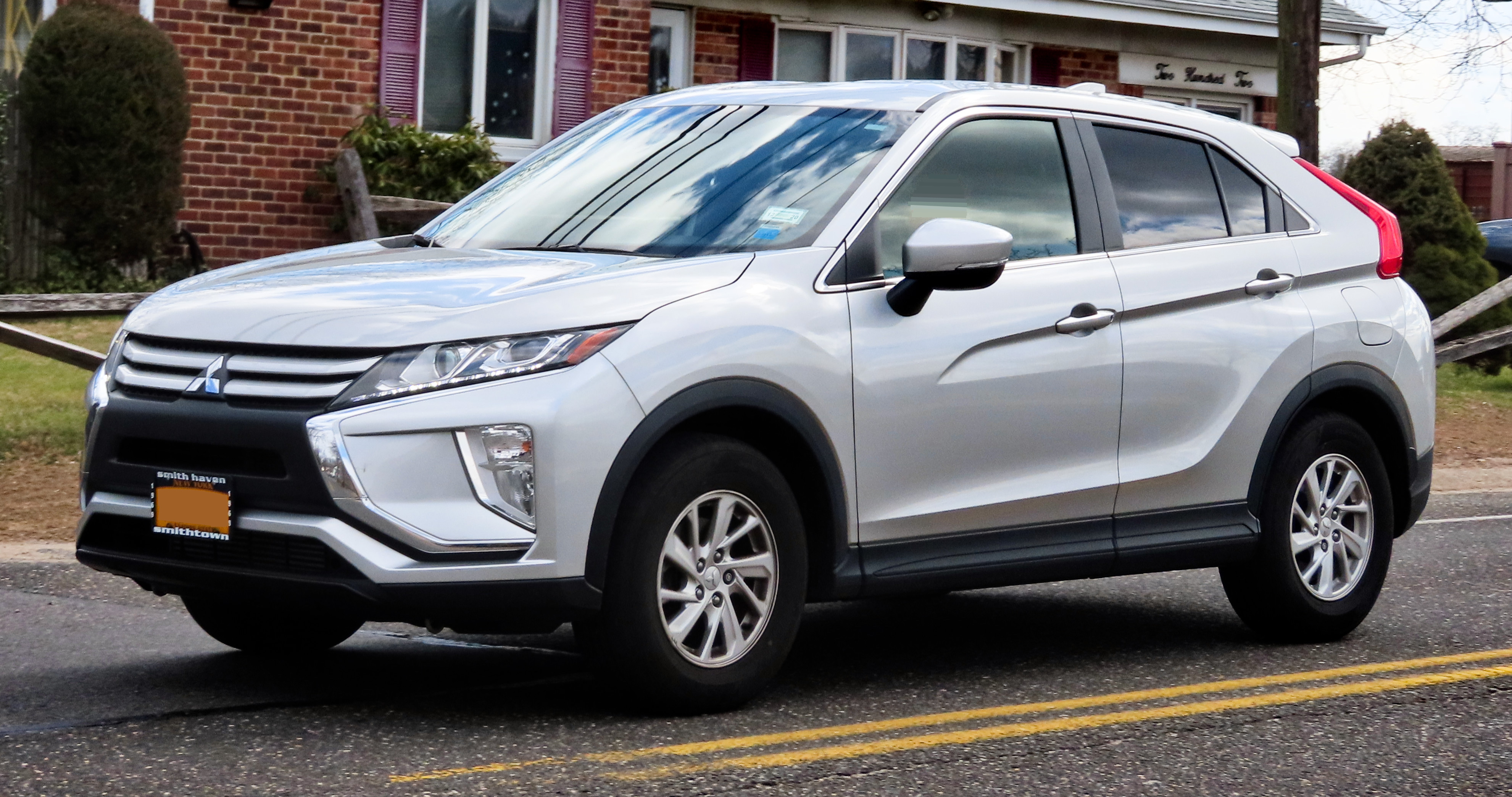
- 2018 Eclipse Cross (pre-facelift, US)

Overview
- Model code: GK; GL; YA; YB
- Production: October 2017 – present
- Model years: 2018–present; 2018–2025 (Europe)
- Assembly: Japan: Okazaki, Aichi (Okazaki Plant); China: Changsha, Hunan (GMMC until 2023); Brazil: Catalão (HPE Automotores)
- Designer: Norihiko Yoshimine and Atsushi Goto

Body and chassis
- Layout: Front-engine, front-wheel-drive; Front-engine, four-wheel-drive
- Platform: Mitsubishi GS platform
- Related: Mitsubishi RVR/ASX/Outlander Sport; Mitsubishi Outlander (third generation)

Powertrain
- Engine: Petrol: 1.5 L 4B40 turbo I4 (GK1W/YA); 2.0 L 4B11 I4 (GK2W); Petrol plug-in hybrid: 2.4 L 4B12 I4 (GL3W, 2021–present); Diesel: 2.2 L 4N14 turbo I4 (GK9W)
- Power output: 110–120 kW (148–161 hp; 150–163 PS) (1.5 L turbo); 110 kW (148 hp; 150 PS) (2.0 L); 94 kW (126 hp; 128 PS) (2.4 L PHEV); 107 kW (143 hp; 145 PS) (2.2 L diesel)
- Transmission: 6-speed manual (1.5 L FWD); 8-speed Aisin AWF8F35 automatic (2.2 L diesel); INVECS-III CVT with 6-speed simulation (2.0 L); INVECS-III CVT with 8-speed simulation (1.5 L); GKN Multi-Mode eTransmission (PHEV)

Dimensions
- Wheelbase: 2,670 mm (105.1 in)
- Length: 4,405 mm (173.4 in) (2017–2020); 4,545 mm (178.9 in) (2021–present)
- Width: 1,805 mm (71.1 in)
- Height: 1,685 mm (66.3 in)
- Curb weight: 1,425–1,480 kg (3,141.6–3,262.8 lb) (FWD); 1,520–1,680 kg (3,351.0–3,703.8 lb) (AWD); 1,900–1,920 kg (4,188.8–4,232.9 lb) (PHEV)

Chronology
- Successor: Mitsubishi Eclipse Cross EV (second generation, Europe)

The first-generation Eclipse Cross was previewed by the XR-PHEV and XR-PHEV II concepts, revealed in 2013 and 2015. The production version was first introduced at the 87th Geneva Motor Show in March 2017.

The diesel variant was launched in June 2019, followed by the PHEV variant in December 2020. The diesel engine option is not available in North America.

=== Markets ===
The Eclipse Cross was available in Japan, Australia, and North America from the beginning of 2018. It was released in Japan on 1 March 2018. It was also released in Mexico in the beginning of February 2019. In Mexico, it is offered in GLX, GLS and Limited trim levels.

In Indonesia, the Eclipse Cross was revealed on 9 July 2019, and was launched at the 27th Gaikindo Indonesia International Auto Show on 18 July 2019. It is available in a sole Ultimate variant powered by a 1.5-litre turbocharged petrol engine. The Eclipse Cross was discontinued in Indonesia in March 2022.

For the 2020 model year in the United States, the Eclipse Cross received several changes. The base ES model received redesigned sixteen-inch alloy wheels and all trim levels were now available in front-wheel drive configuration, whereas only the base trim ES was available with front-wheel drive for the previous model year. SE and SEL models also received various standard safety features like forward collision mitigation. Every Eclipse Cross in the Canadian market is sold standard with Mitsubishi's S-AWC 4WD system. Canadian trim levels are the ES, SE, SEL, and top-trim GT, and all have an available 907 kg (2,000 lb) towing capacity.

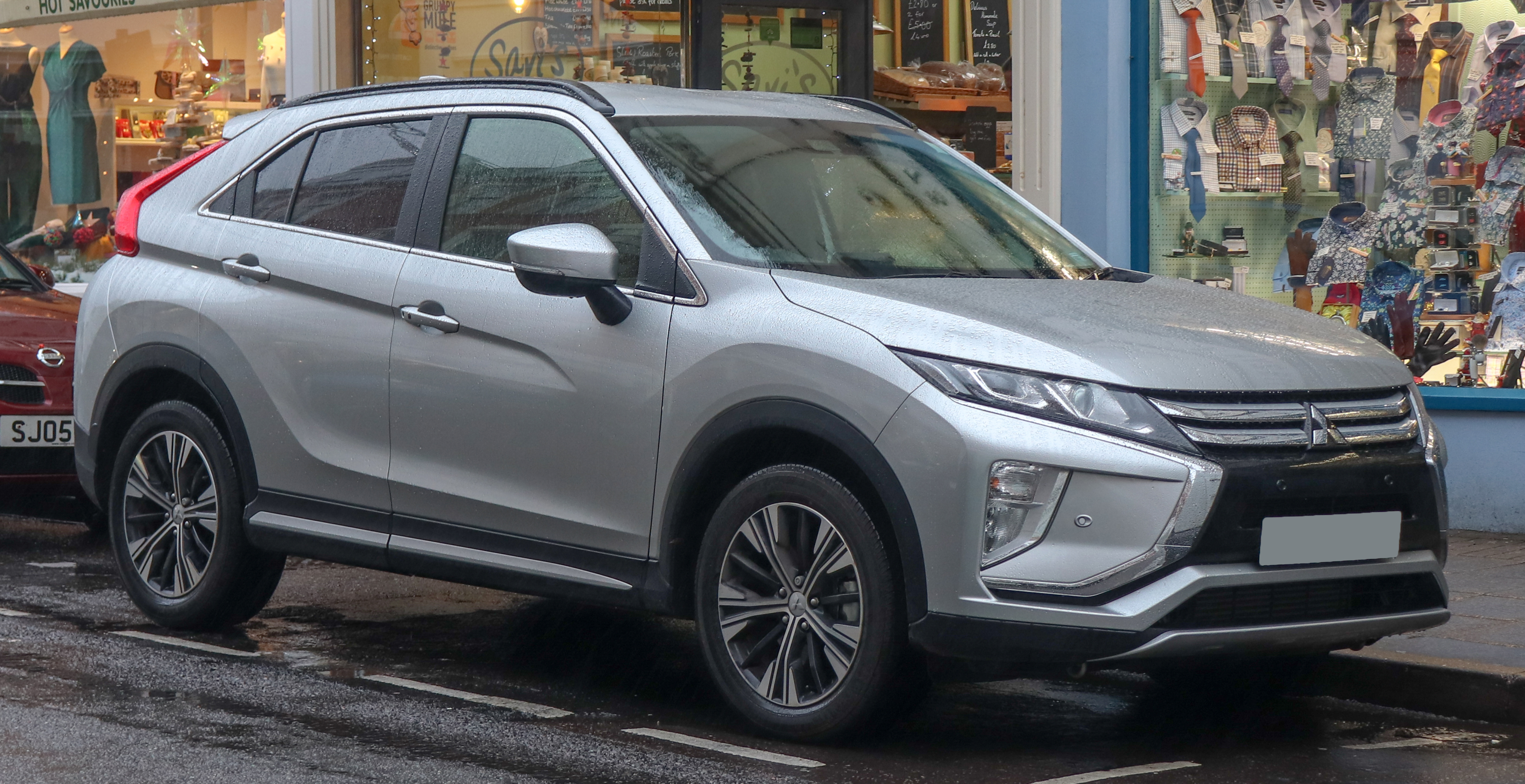
Pre-facelift

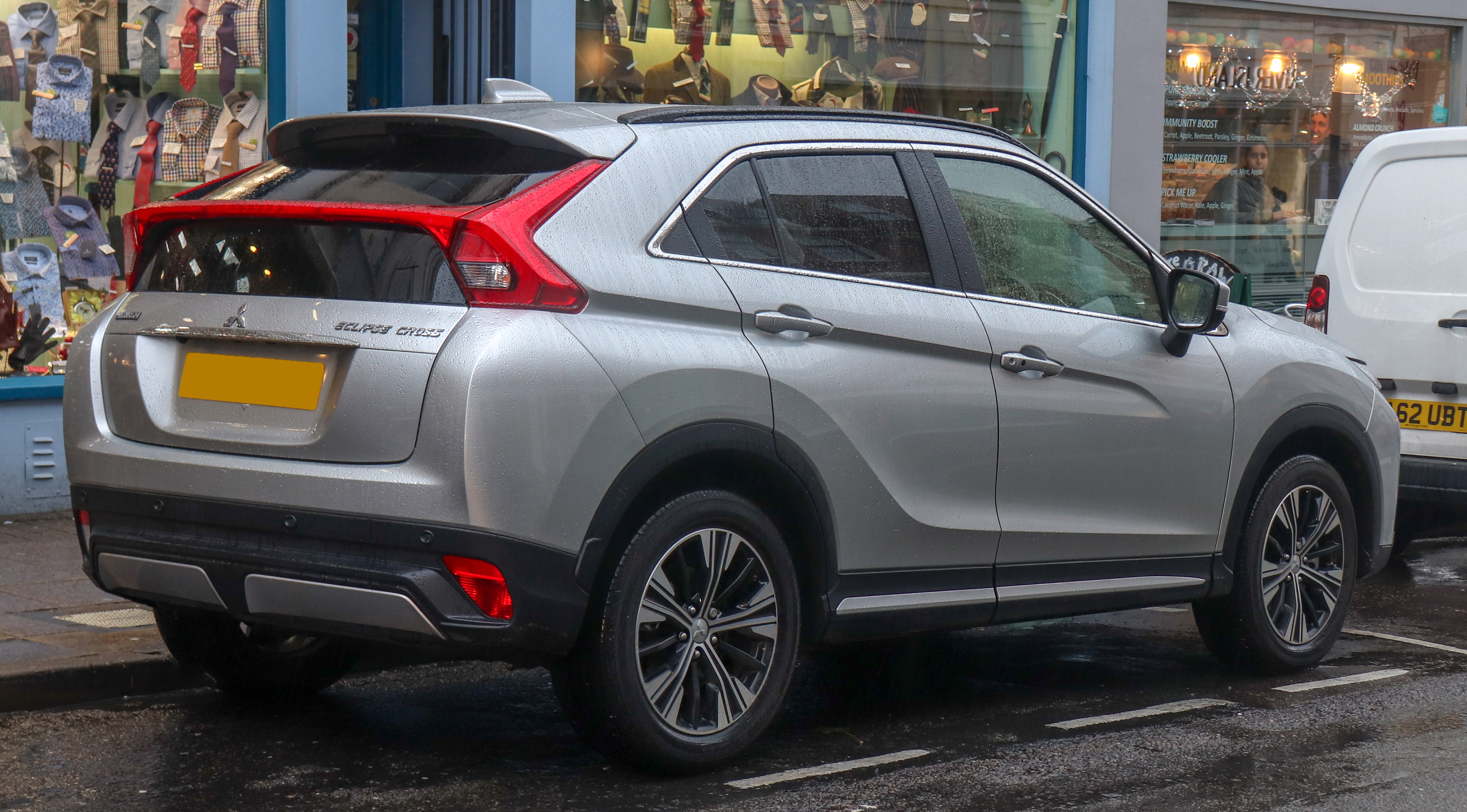
Rear view (pre-facelift)

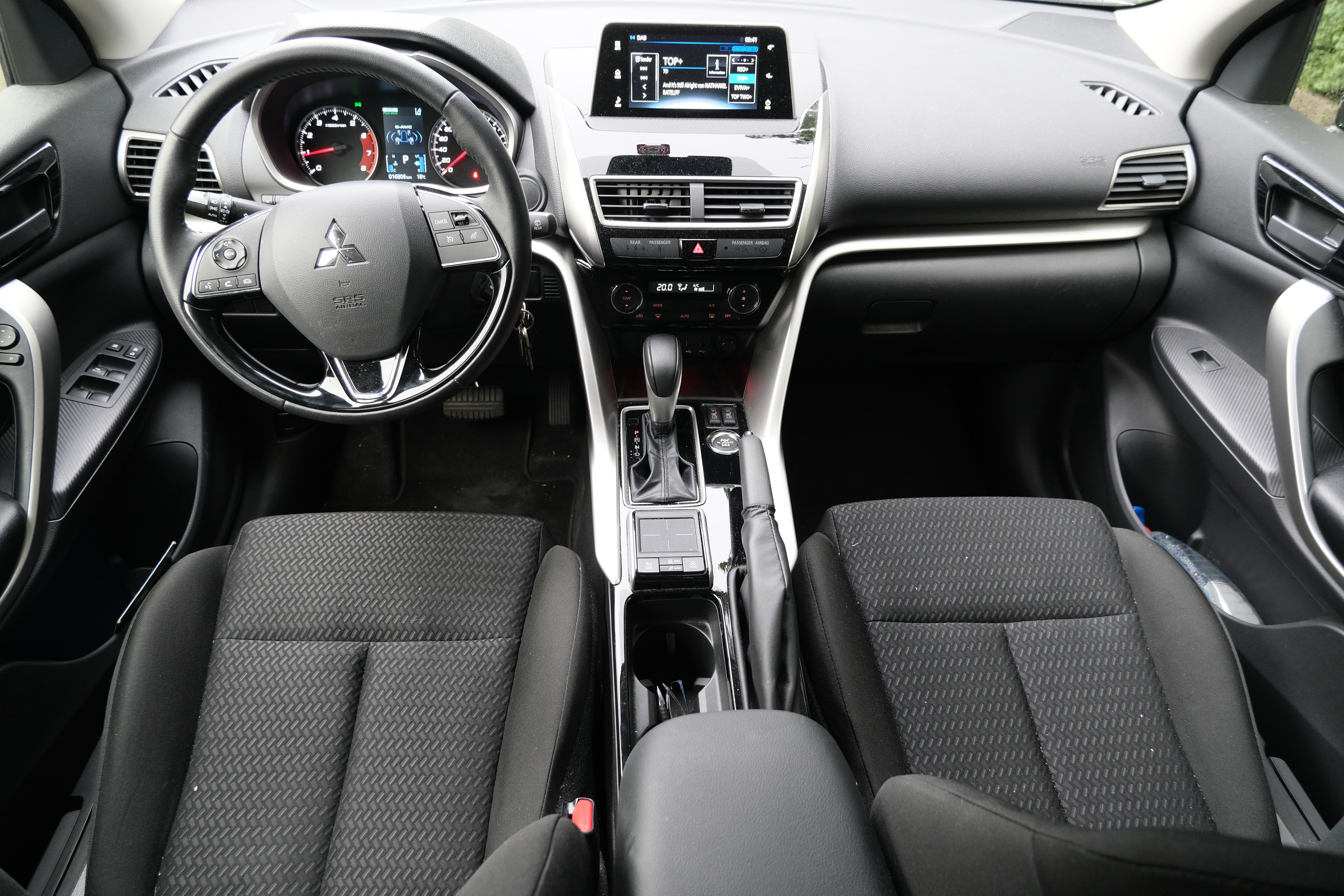
Interior

=== Mechanical ===
The Mitsubishi Eclipse Cross is currently offered as a petrol, diesel, and PHEV plug-in hybrid depending on the region. The petrol engines are a turbocharged 1.5-litre inline four connected to a CVT transmission with 8 simulated gear ratios and a 2.0-litre inline-four connected to a CVT with 6 simulated gear ratios. A six-speed manual is also available for front-wheel-drive models in some regions. Power output for the 4B40 1.5-litre turbo depend on the region of sale. Lowest output available is 148 hp, followed by 152 hp and 161 hp. Torque remains at 184 ft-lbs (250 Nm) and is produced from 1800 RPM to 3500 RPM. It is Mitsubishi's newest in-house engine design and is equipped with dual-port injection and Mitsubishi's MIVEC intake system. North American models are equipped with the mid-spec engine as standard while Australian models are powered by the lower 148 hp (110 kW) spec engines. The recommended fuel is regular octane, though the manual states premium fuel may be used for increased performance and mileage depending on conditions. The 4B11 2.0-litre inline-four and 4B12 2.4-litre inline-four have been in production since 2007, with the 2.0-litre being used as the base engine in some regions, while the 2.4-litre is used as the gasoline counterpart in the PHEV version of the Eclipse Cross. The 4N14 2.2-litre inline-four diesel engine comes standard with a traditional eight-speed automatic transmission. In the Eclipse Cross it produces 175 hp and 280 ft-lb (380 Nm) of torque.

=== Facelift ===
The facelifted Eclipse Cross was revealed in October 2020. It went on sale in February 2021 for the 2022 model year in North America. The LE trim was added, positioned between ES and SE trims.

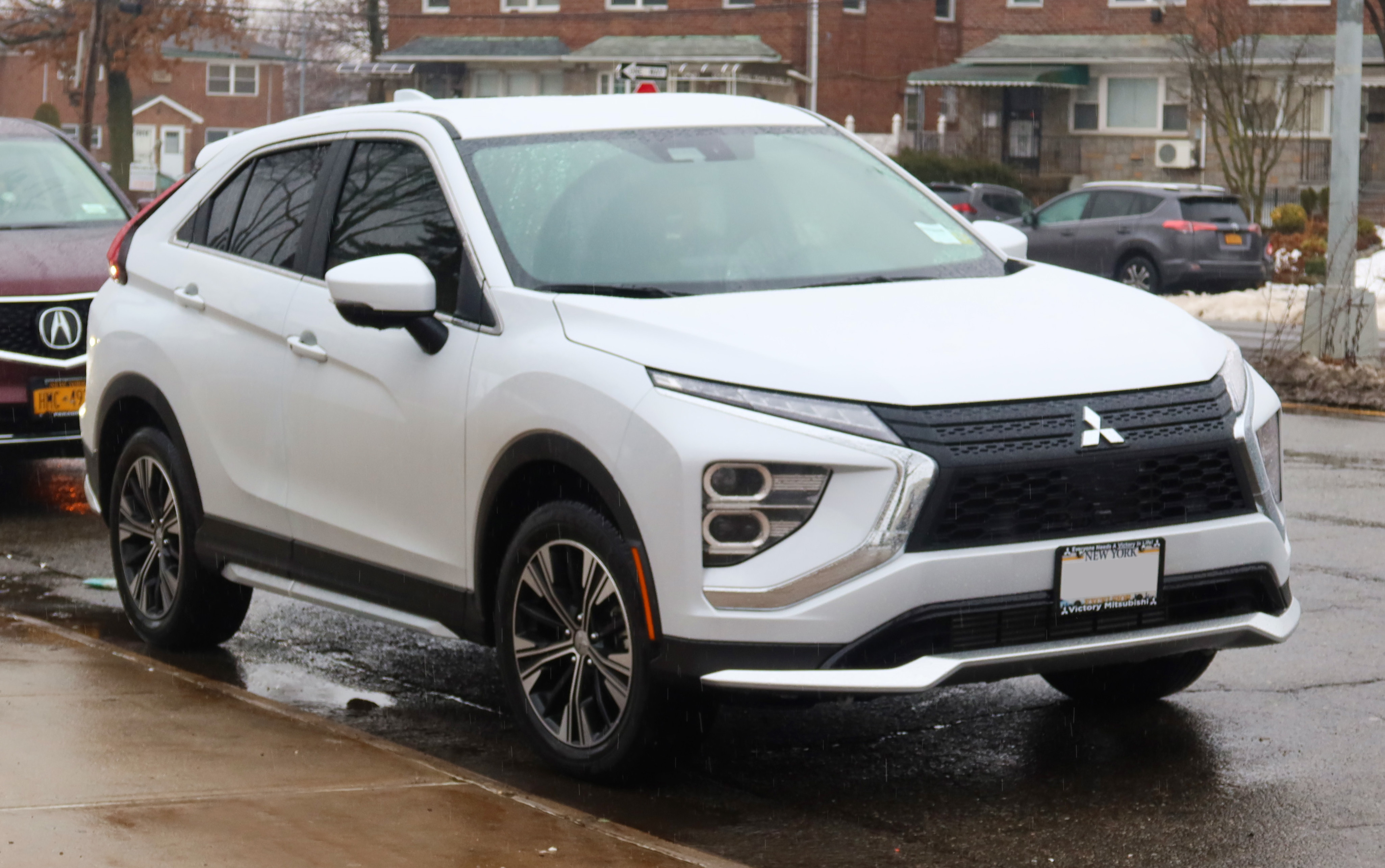
2022 Mitsubishi Eclipse Cross SEL (facelift, United States)

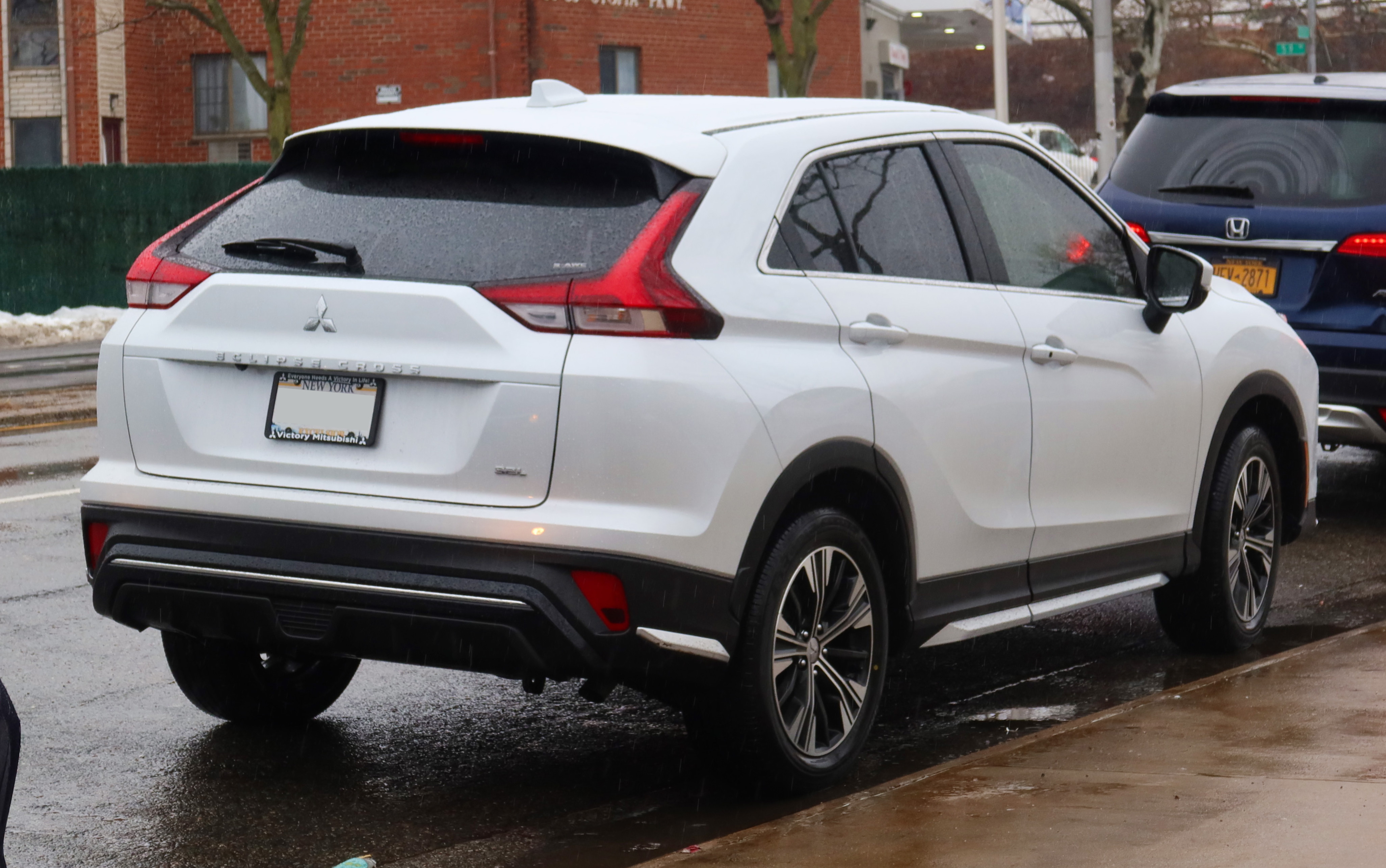
2022 Mitsubishi Eclipse Cross SEL (facelift, United States)

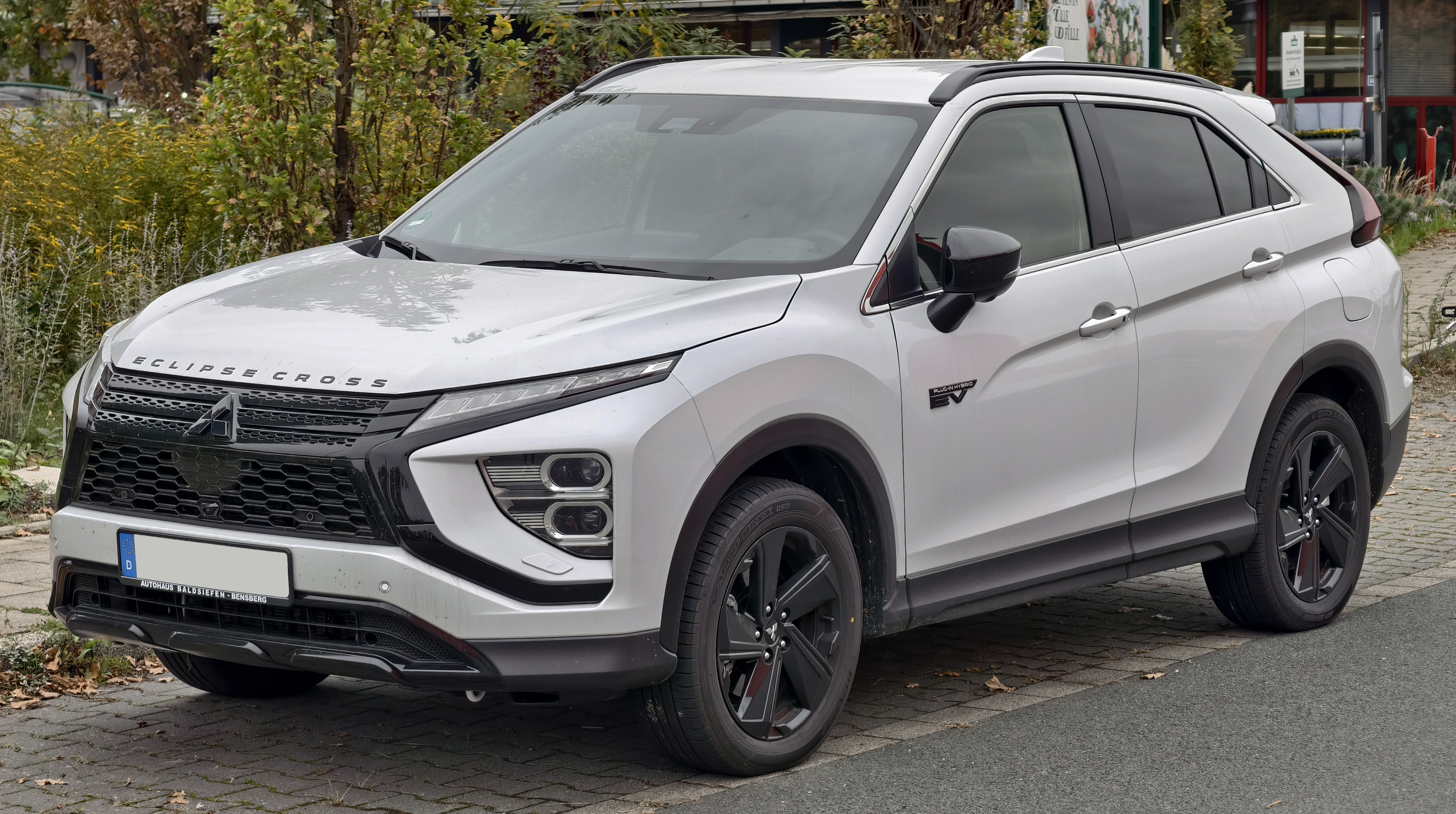
Mitsubishi Eclipse Cross PHEV (Europe, facelift)

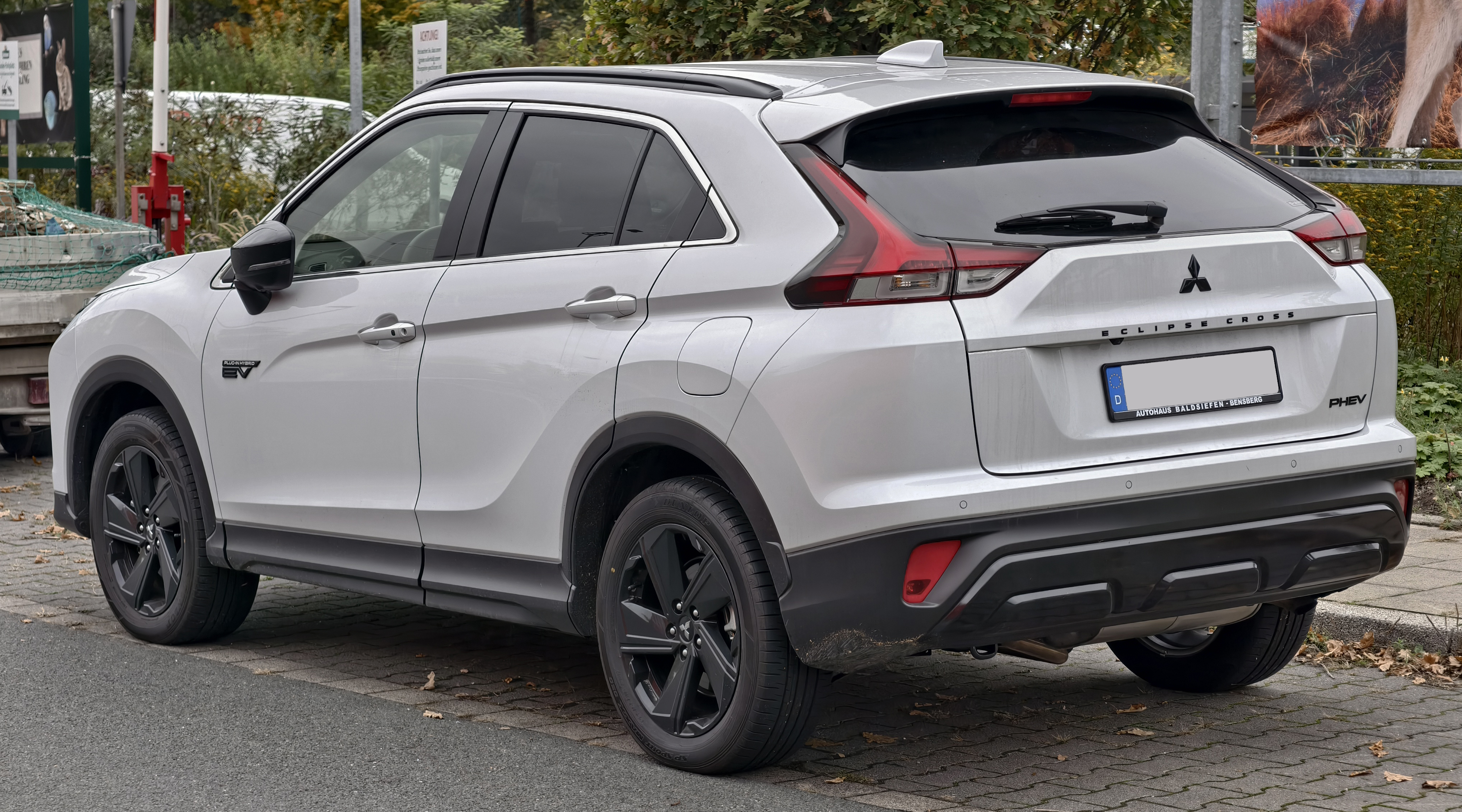
Mitsubishi Eclipse Cross PHEV (Europe, facelift)

=== Marketing ===
Mitsubishi sponsored the special on ABC about the solar eclipse of August 21, 2017, including photographing the Eclipse Cross along with the eclipse. On that same day, the Eclipse Cross was also shown for the first time on television on Good Morning America.

=== Safety ===
It has ventilated front disc brakes and solid ones in the rear.

==== Latin NCAP ====
The Japan-made Eclipse Cross in its most basic Latin American market configuration with 3 airbags received 4 stars for adult occupants and 3 stars for toddlers from Latin NCAP 2.0 in 2019.

Latin NCAP 2.0 test results Mitsubishi Eclipse Cross + 3 Airbags (2019, based on Euro NCAP 2008)
| Test | Points | Stars |
|---|---|---|
| Adult occupant: | 30.94/34.0 | 4 /5 stars |
| Child occupant: | 30.00/49.00 | 3 /5 stars |

==== Euro NCAP ====
The Eclipse Cross in its standard European market configuration received 5 stars from Euro NCAP in 2017.

==== ASEAN NCAP ====
ASEAN NCAP test results Mitsubishi Eclipse Cross (2017)
| Test | Points |
|---|---|
| Overall: | 5 /5 stars |
| Adult occupant: | 48.81 |
| Child occupant: | 22.11 |
| Safety assist: | 20.44 |

==== North America ====
===== IIHS =====
2018-2023 models all receive a Overall GOOD Crashworthiness rating when following the original IIHS Moderate Overlap and Side Impact models.

For the 2022-2023 models IIHS introduced updated tests for Moderate Overlap and Side Impact which resulted in these two tests receiving a POOR rating.

NHTSA
| Model Year | Overall Rating |
|---|---|
| 2018 | Not Rated |
| 2019 | Not Rated |
| 2020 | 5/5 stars |
| 2021 | Model year skipped |
| 2022 | 5/5 stars |
| 2023 | 5/5 stars |

==== ANCAP ====
ANCAP test results Mitsubishi Eclipse Cross (2017, aligned with Euro NCAP)
| Test | Points | % |
|---|---|---|
| Overall: | 5 /5 stars | |
| Adult occupant: | 36.9 | 97% |
| Child occupant: | 38.2 | 78% |
| Pedestrian: | 33.8 | 80% |
| Safety assist: | 7 | 58% |

== Second generation (2025) ==
The second-generation Eclipse Cross has been sold exclusively in Europe since 2025 as a battery electric model based on the Renault Scenic E-Tech.

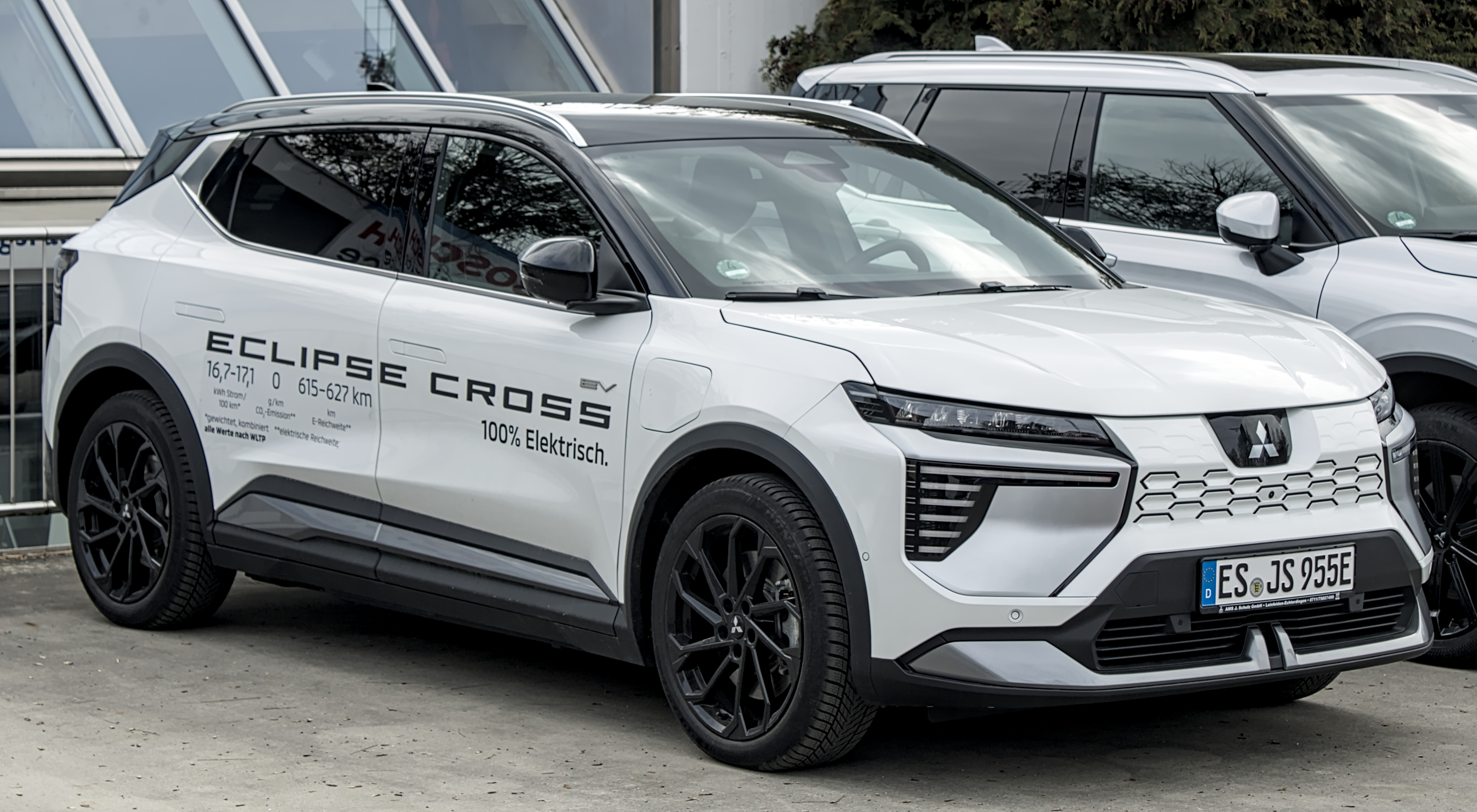
Eclipse Cross EV (Europe)

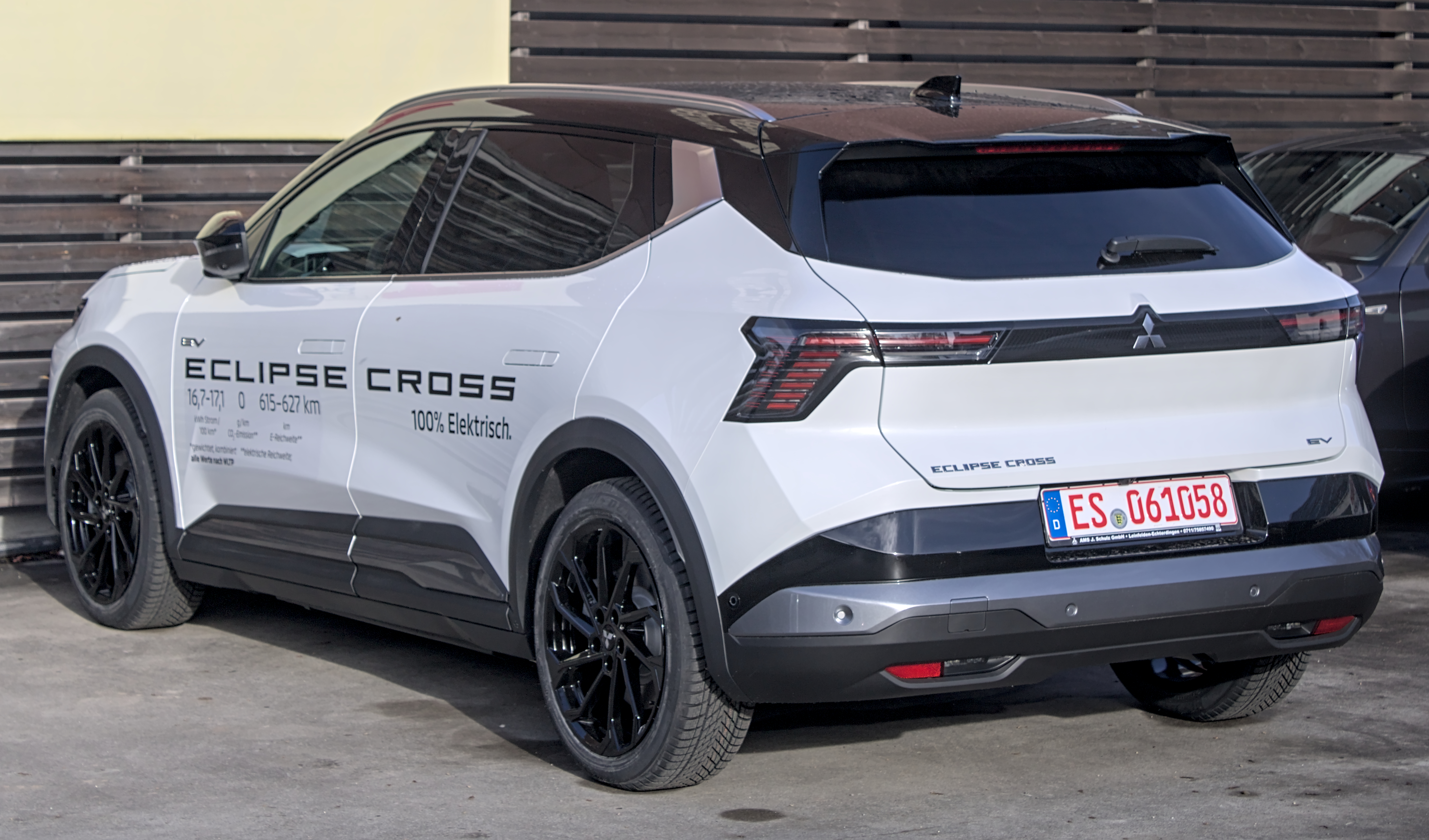
Rear view

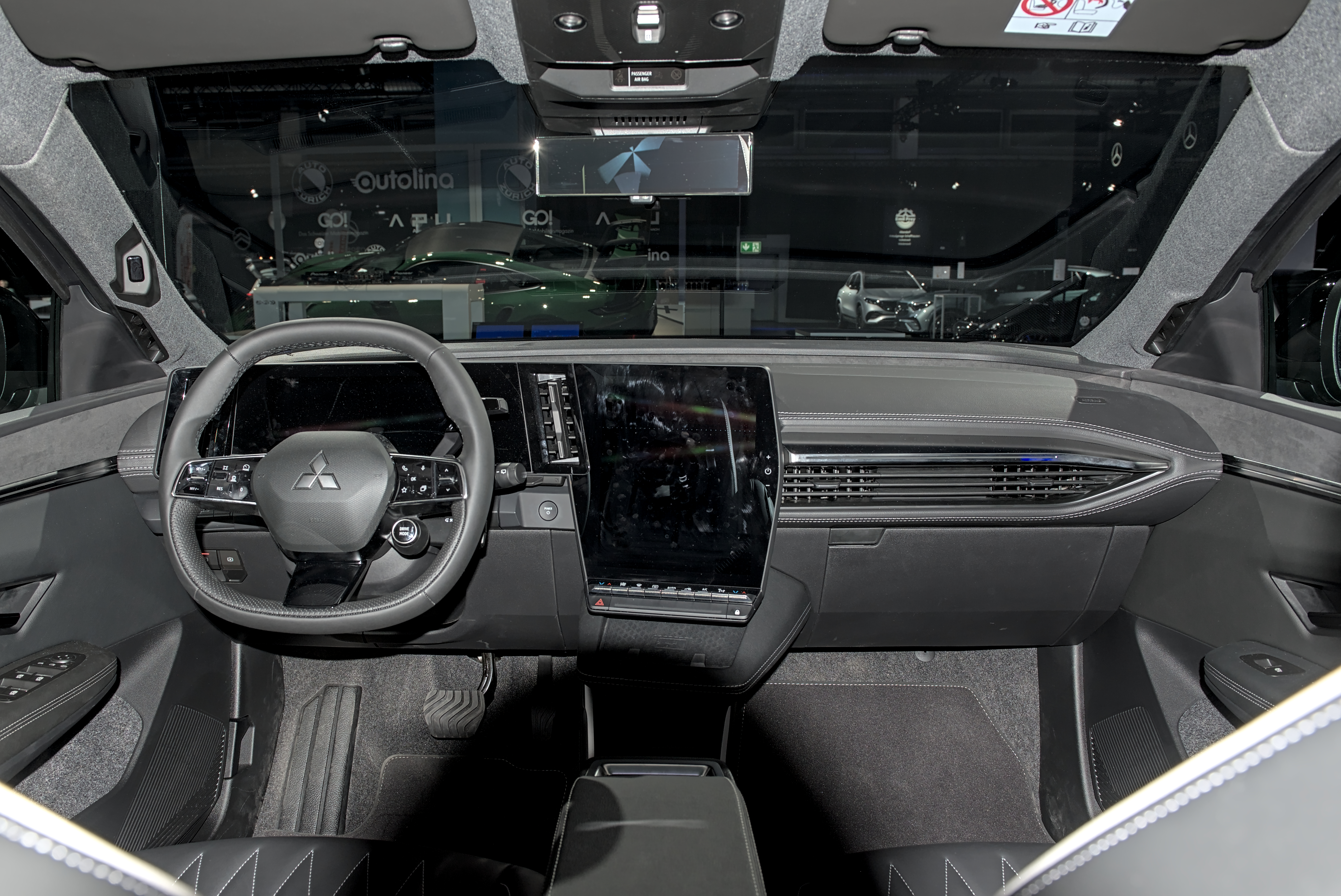
Interior

== Sales and production ==
=== Sales ===
| Year | Japan | U.S. | Europe | Canada | Brazil | Mexico | Australia | China |
|---|---|---|---|---|---|---|---|---|
| 2017 | | | 674 | | | | | |
| 2018 | 11,592 | 9,485 | 26,754 | 3,596 | 534 | | 7,521 | 5,738 |
| 2019 | 7,758 | 19,661 | 27,110 | 5,101 | 2,356 | 923 | 6,998 | 26,512 |
| 2020 | 5,374 | 10,319 | 13,772 | 2,972 | 2,544 | 270 | 4,517 | 7,569 |
| 2021 | 8,882 | 8,947 | 13,716 | 4,520 | 2,325 | 28 | 6,132 | 4,144 |
| 2022 | 7,693 | 10,718 | 28,013 | 4,446 | 3,723 | | 5,923 | 835 |
| 2023 | 8,416 | 9,922 | | 5,428 | 3,989 | | 7,786 | 1,262 |
| 2024 | 7,632 | 12,274 | | 5,292 | 8,298 | | 9,221 | |
| 2025 | 7,847 | 17,508 | | 5,930 | 10,032 | | 4,477 | |

=== Production ===
| Year | Production | |
| Year | Japan | China |
|---|---|---|
| 2017 | 48,526 | - |
| 2018 | 102,690 | 15,559 |

(Sources: Facts & Figures 2018, Facts & Figures 2019, Mitsubishi Motors website)

== Motorsport ==
A rally-raid car based on the Eclipse Cross entered 2019 Dakar Rally, driven by Cristina Gutiérrez Herrero.

The Eclipse Cross has been competing in Stock Car Brasil since 2025.
