= Mitsubishi Outlander =

Compact crossover SUV

- 2022 Mitsubishi Outlander SE

Overview
- Manufacturer: Mitsubishi Motors
- Also called: Mitsubishi Airtrek (Japan, 2001–2008); Peugeot 4007 (2007–2012); Citroën C-Crosser (2007–2012); Nissan Rogue Plug-in Hybrid (North America, 2026)
- Production: 2001–present

Body and chassis
- Class: Compact crossover SUV
- Body style: 5-door SUV
- Layout: Front-engine, front-wheel-drive; Front-engine, all-wheel-drive (S-AWC)

The Mitsubishi Outlander (Japanese: 三菱・アウトランダー, Hepburn: Mitsubishi Autorandā) is a compact crossover SUV manufactured by Japanese automaker Mitsubishi Motors since 2001. It was originally known as the Mitsubishi Airtrek (Japanese: 三菱・エアトレック, Hepburn: Mitsubishi Eatorekku) when it was introduced in Japan.

The original Airtrek name was chosen to "describe the vehicle's ability to transport its passengers on adventure-packed journeys in a 'free-as-a-bird' manner", and was "coined from Air and Trek to express the idea of footloose, adventure-filled motoring pleasure." The Outlander nameplate which replaced it evoked a "feeling of journeying to distant, unexplored lands in search of adventure."

The second generation of the vehicle was introduced in 2006 and all markets including Japan adopted the Outlander name, although production of the older version continued in parallel. It was built on the company's GS platform, and used various engines developed by Mitsubishi, Volkswagen, and PSA Peugeot Citroën. PSA's Citroën C-Crosser and Peugeot 4007, which were manufactured by Mitsubishi in Japan, are badge engineered versions of the second generation Outlander. Global sales achieved the 1.5 million unit milestone in October 2016, 15 years after its market launch.

As part of the third generation line-up, Mitsubishi launched in January 2013 a plug-in hybrid model called Outlander PHEV. As of January 2022, global sales totaled about 300,000 units.

The fourth-generation model was released in 2021 as a 2022 model. Following Mitsubishi's entry to Renault–Nissan–Mitsubishi Alliance, the fourth-generation Outlander is based on the Rogue/X-Trail, which is built on the CMF-CD platform.

== First generation (CU/ZE/ZF; 2001) ==
First generation
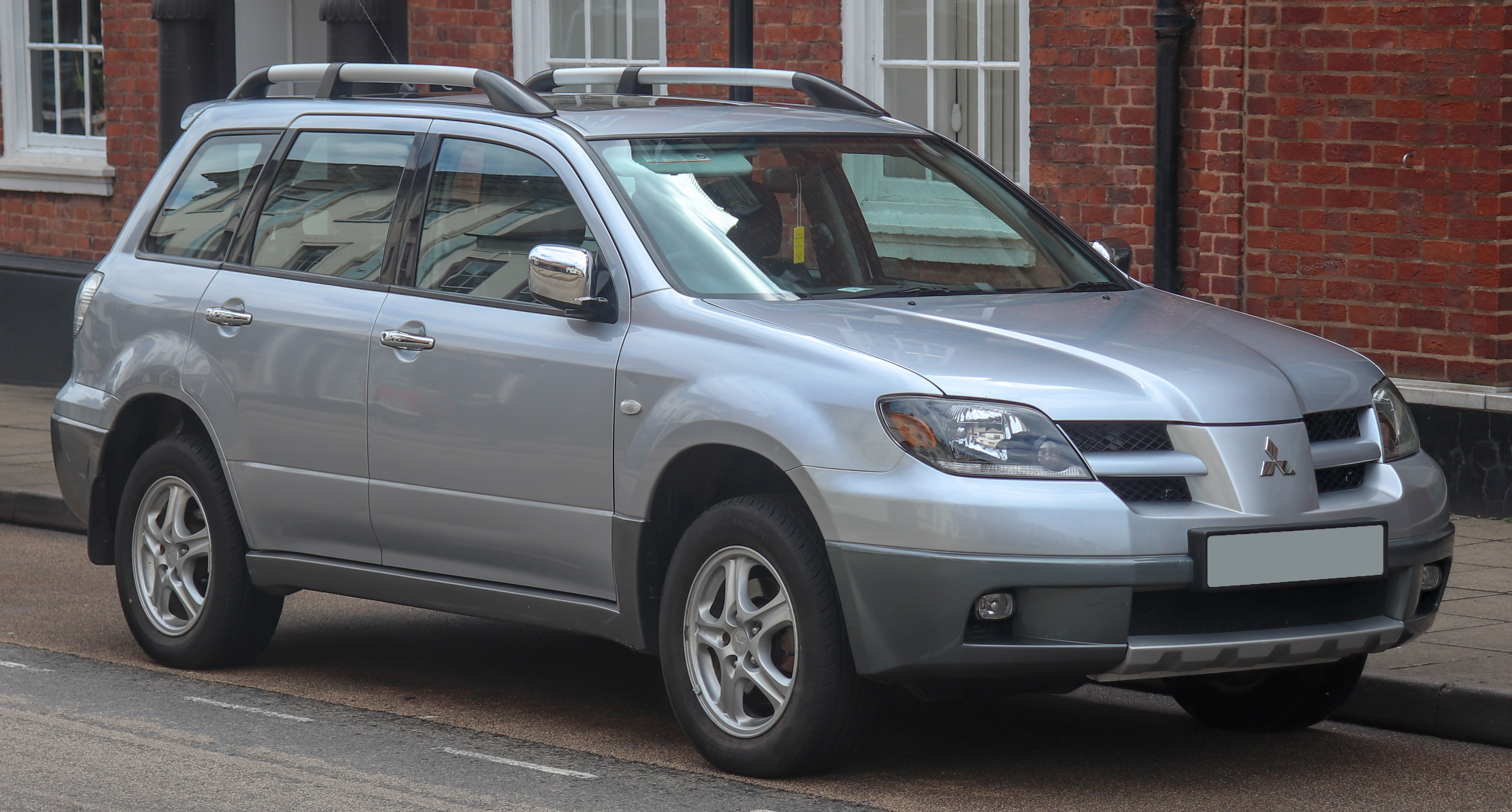
- 2003 Mitsubishi Outlander Sport SE (UK)

Overview
- Model code: CU; ZE; ZF
- Also called: Mitsubishi Airtrek; Mitsubishi Montero Outlander (South America)
- Production: 2001–2008 (Airtrek); 2003–2006 (Outlander)
- Assembly: Japan: Okazaki (Nagoya Plant)
- Designer: Olivier Boulay (Outlander)

Body and chassis
- Related: Mitsubishi Lancer; Mitsubishi Grandis; Mitsubishi RVR

Powertrain
- Engine: Petrol: 2.0 L 4G63 DOHC I4; 2.0 L 4G63T DOHC turbo I4; 2.4 L 4G64 SOHC I4 (2003–2006); 2.4 L 4G69 MIVEC I4; 2.4 L 4G64 GDI I4
- Transmission: 5-speed manual 4-speed INVECS-II automatic 5-speed INVECS-II automatic

Dimensions
- Wheelbase: 2,625 mm (103.3 in)
- Length: 4,410 mm (173.6 in) (Airtrek); 4,545 mm (178.9 in) (Outlander)
- Width: 1,750–1,780 mm (68.9–70.1 in)
- Height: 1,540–1,585 mm (60.6–62.4 in) (Airtrek); 1,605–1,685 mm (63.2–66.3 in) (Outlander)
- Curb weight: 1,605–1,745 kg (3,538–3,847 lb)

The first-generation Outlander/Airtrek was based on the Mitsubishi ASX concept vehicle exhibited at the 2001 North American International Auto Show. The ASX (Active Sports Crossover) represented Mitsubishi's approach to the industry wide crossover SUV trend for retaining the all-season and off-road abilities offered by a high ground clearance and four-wheel drive, while still offering car-like levels of emissions, economy, and size.

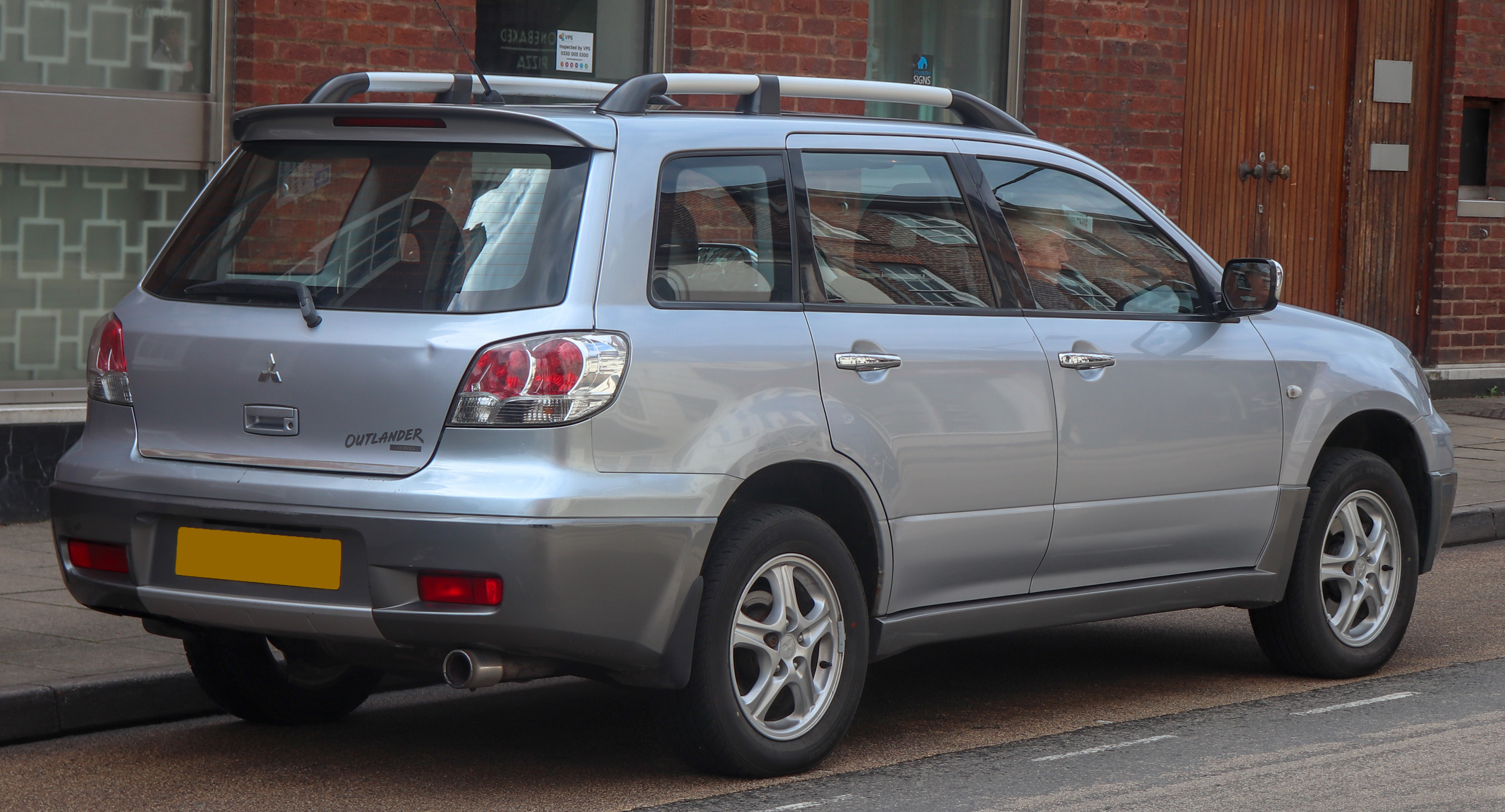
2003 Mitsubishi Outlander Sport SE (UK)

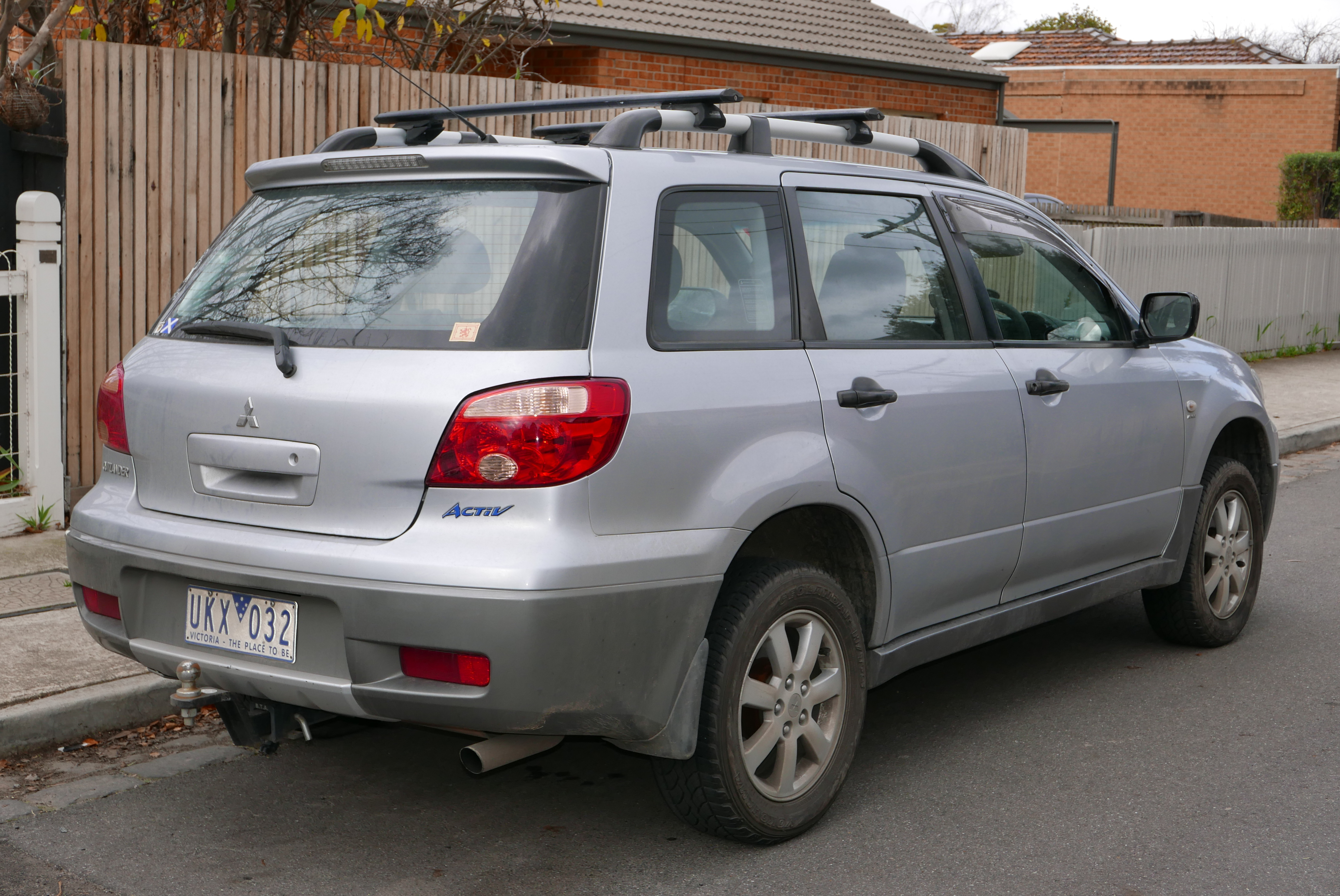
2006 Mitsubishi Outlander Activ (Australia)

The Airtrek was first introduced to the Japanese market on 20 June 2001, and was sold at Mitsubishi Japan dealership chain called Car Plaza. It offered a choice of either a 126 PS (93 kW) 4G63 2.0 L or a 139 PS (102 kW) 4G64 2.4 L GDI, mated to a standard INVECS-II 4-speed automatic transmission. Both front- and four-wheel drive were available. The four-wheel drive version uses open differentials for the front and rear axles, with a viscous coupling unit for the center differential. A performance-oriented model, called the Turbo-R, was introduced in 2002 and used a detuned version of the Lancer Evolution's 4G63T 2.0 L I4 turbo. The engine produced 240 PS (177 kW) and 343 N⋅m (253 lb⋅ft), although in export markets the Outlander version's output was reduced to 202 PS (149 kW) and 303 N⋅m (223 lb⋅ft). The availability of four-cylinder engines under 2.0 liters offered Japanese buyers a vehicle that was in compliance with Japanese regulations concerning exterior dimensions and engine displacement, however, the exterior dimensions exceed Japanese regulations for the "compact" designation.

The Outlander was arrived in 2003 in North America, replacing the Mitsubishi Montero Sport, with a modified front grille and headlights which increased the overall length by approximately 130 millimetres (5.1 in), and the two models were manufactured in parallel thereafter. It shared its platform with the Mitsubishi Grandis, also introduced in 2003. A version of the 4G64 powerplant was offered first, while a 4G69 2.4 L SOHC MIVEC I4 producing 120 kW (163 PS) and 220 N⋅m (162 lb⋅ft), and the turbocharged 4G63T appeared in 2004. All had the option of front- or four-wheel drive.

In several South American markets it was known as the Montero Outlander, to benefit from an association with the strong-selling Mitsubishi Montero Sport.

=== Mitsubishi Airtrek ===
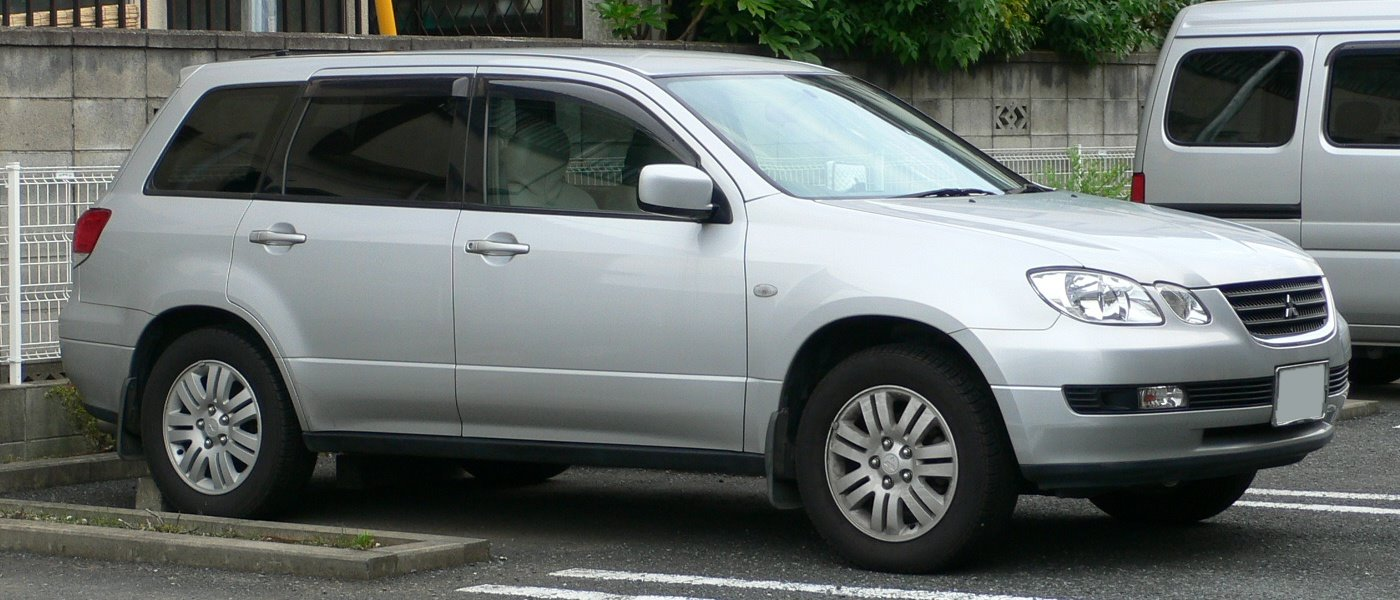
2001 Mitsubishi Airtrek (Japan)

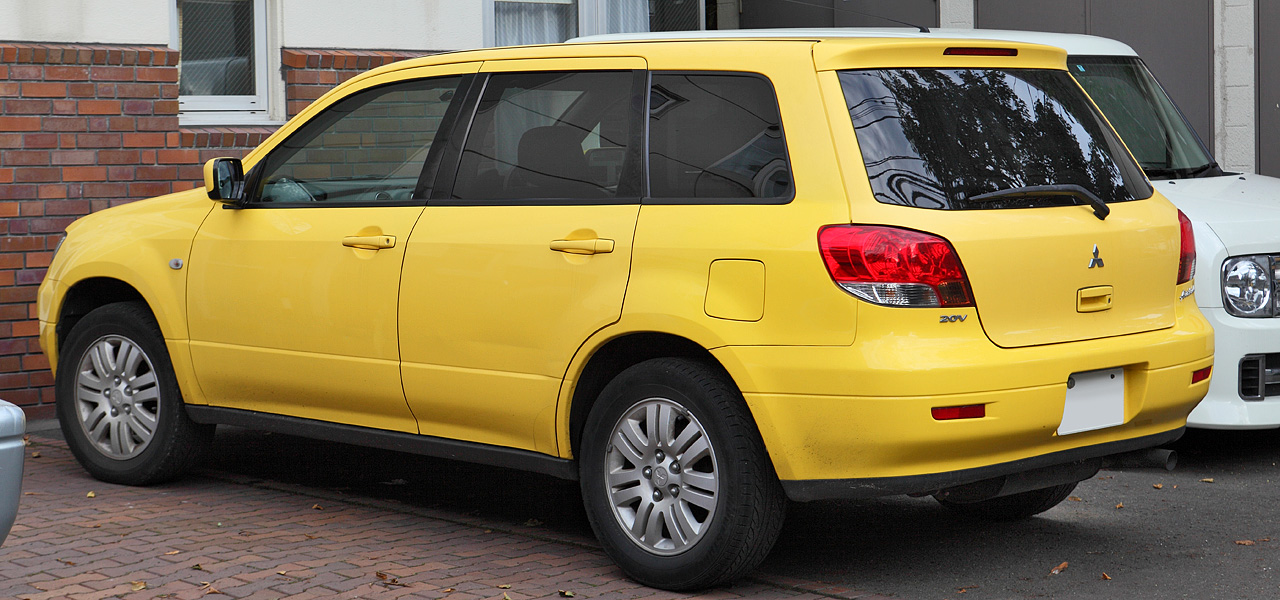
Mitsubishi Airtrek (Japan)

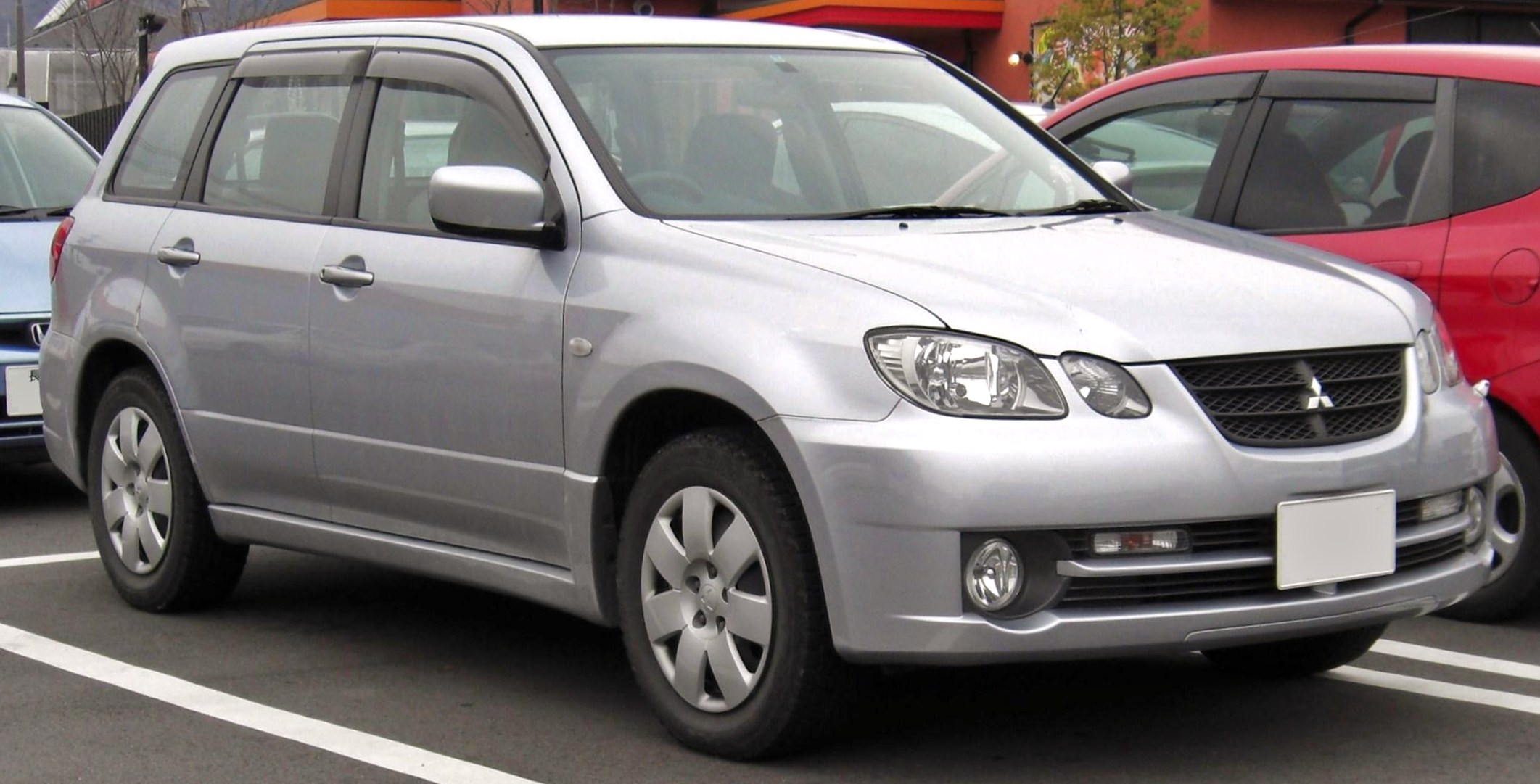
Mitsubishi Airtrek Turbo-R (Japan)

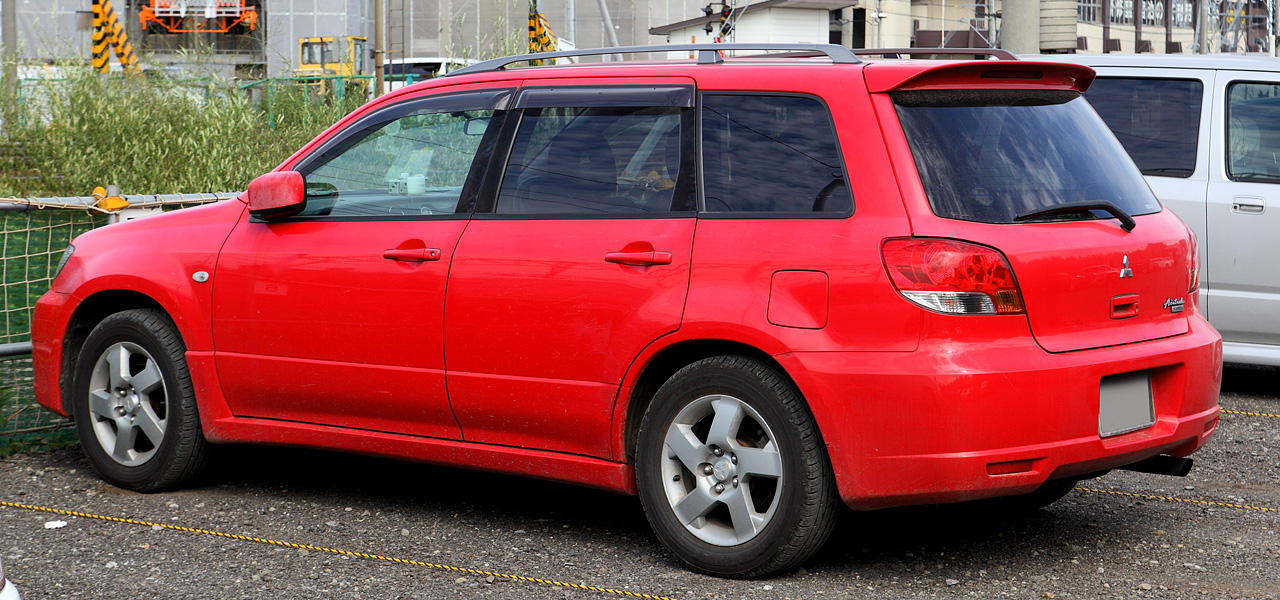
Mitsubishi Airtrek Turbo-R (Japan)

=== Safety ===
ANCAP test results* Mitsubishi Outlander variants with dual frontal airbags (2003)
Test	Score
Overall	4 /5 stars
Frontal offset	13.03/16
Side impact	14.97/16
Pole	Not Assessed
Seat belt reminders	0/3
Whiplash protection	Not Assessed
Pedestrian protection	Poor
Electronic stability control	Not Assessed

== Second generation (CW/ZG/ZH; 2006) ==
Second generation
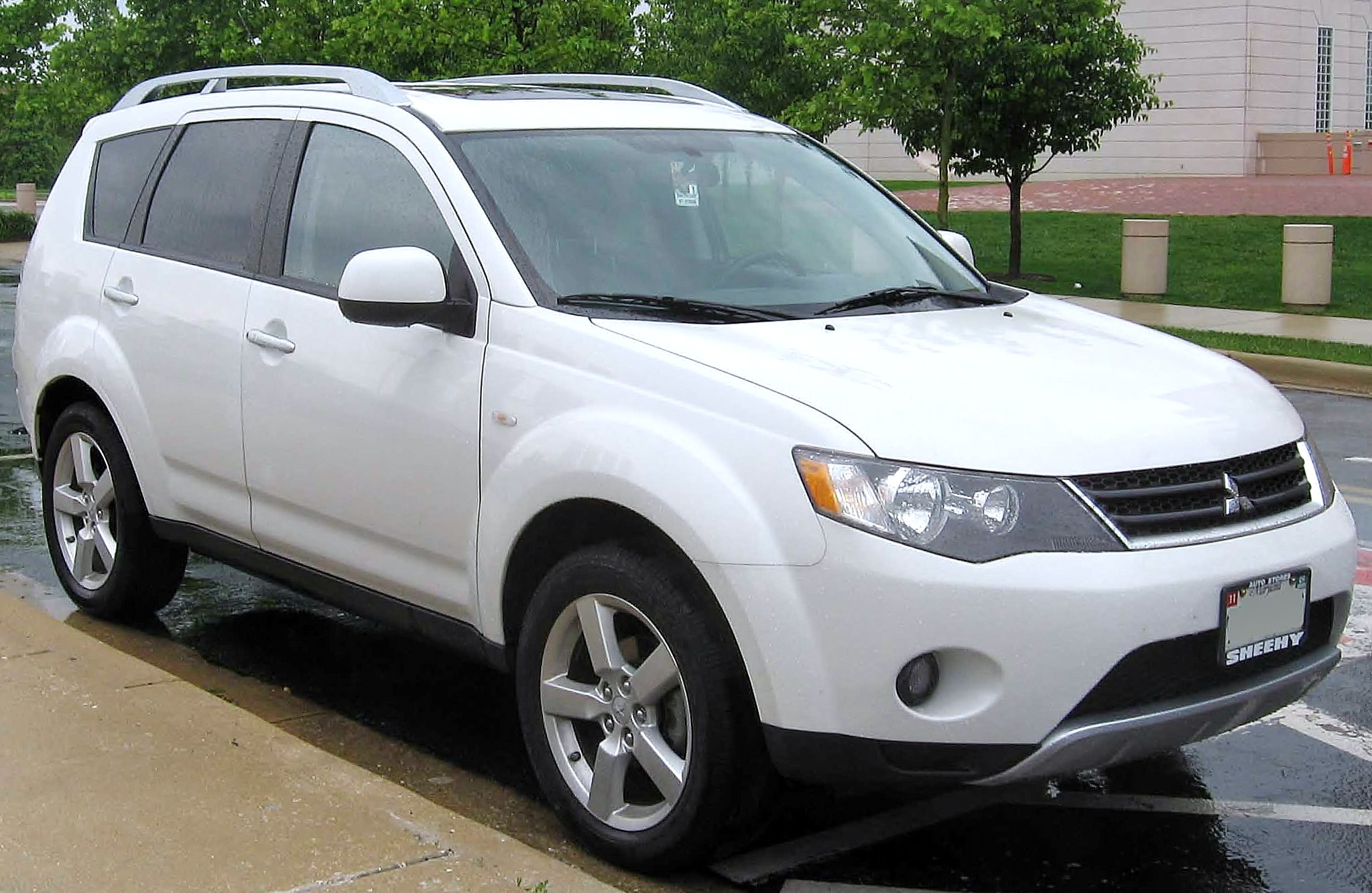
- Pre-facelift Mitsubishi Outlander (US)

Overview
- Model code: CW; ZG; ZH
- Also called: Peugeot 4007; Citroën C-Crosser
- Production: 2006–2012
- Model years: 2007–2013 (North America)
- Assembly: Japan: Okazaki (Nagoya Plant); Netherlands: Born (NedCar); Russia: Kaluga (PCMA Rus); Taiwan: Taoyuan (CMC)
- Designer: Omer Halilhodžić

Body and chassis
- Platform: Mitsubishi GS platform

Powertrain
- Engine: Petrol: 2.0 L 4B11 DOHC MIVEC I4 (Japan, New Zealand); 2.4 L 4B12 DOHC MIVEC I4; 3.0 L 6B31 SOHC MIVEC V6; Diesel: 2.0 L VW 2.0 TDI PD I4; 2.2 L PSA DW12 HDi I4; 2.3 L 4N14 DI-D DOHC MIVEC I4
- Transmission: 5-speed manual 6-speed manual INVECS-III CVT; 6-speed automatic 6-speed twin-clutch SST dual-clutch automatic

Dimensions
- Wheelbase: 2,670 mm (105.1 in)
- Length: 2006–2007 (International)/2007–2009 (US/Canada): 4,640 mm (182.7 in); 2008–2009 (International): 4,765 mm (187.6 in); 2010–2012 (International): 4,665 mm (183.7 in)
- Width: 1,800 mm (70.9 in); 2008–2009 (International): 1,795 mm (70.7 in)
- Height: 2006–2007 (International)/2007–2009 (US/Canada): 1,680 mm (66.1 in); 2008–2009 (International): 1,655 mm (65.2 in); 2010–2012: 1,720 mm (67.7 in)
- Curb weight: 1,589–1,720 kg (3,503–3,792 lb)

On 17 October 2005, Mitsubishi launched the second generation model, dropping the Airtrek in Japan in favour of adopting the global name. It features a new DOHC 2.4 L 16-valve MIVEC engine; INVECS-III continuously variable transmission (CVT), Mitsubishi's AWC system which features electronically controlled four-wheel-drive and stability control, on a stretched Mitsubishi GS platform. The North American version, powered by a newly designed 6B31 3.0 L V6 SOHC MIVEC was shown in April 2006 at the New York International Auto Show prior to its release in October the same year. Due to the availability of a V6 engine, Mitsubishi returned to offering a shorter version of this vehicle and reintroduced the Mitsubishi RVR on 17 February 2010. The usage of a four-cylinder engine under 2.0 liters offers Japanese buyers a vehicle that was in compliance with Japanese regulations concerning exterior dimensions and engine displacement, which has tax advantages, giving buyers the ability to purchase a vehicle capable of seating seven people without paying the tax penalty of a larger engine.

The second generation Outlander went on sale in Europe in February 2007, and this time included a diesel engine – essential in the European market at the time. Mitsubishi chose to purchase Volkswagen's 2.0-litre Pumpe-Düse unit with 140 PS (103 kW), as also installed in the European market Grandis. Before this even went on sale, Mitsubishi had decided that there was a need for a more powerful diesel option and by November 2007 higher end diesel models received PSA's 2.2-liter DW12 common rail diesel with 156 PS (115 kW). Both diesels were labelled "Di-D" by Mitsubishi. In September 2010 Mitsubishi's own 2.3-liter 4N14 diesel engine with 177 PS (130 kW) was introduced while the Volkswagen engine was discontinued. The PSA unit continued to be available in certain countries.

The Outlander, which features Mitsubishi's RISE safety body, received a four-star rating from the Euro NCAP car safety performance assessment programme. One of its unique features is something Mitsubishi calls a "Flap-Fold Tailgate"; it is a two-piece tailgate integrated into the rear bumper that folds down for easy loading, while serving as a bench when the tailgate is open, able to accommodate up to 180 kg (400 lb).

In the Philippines, the second generation Outlander was released in 2007. It was offered in 2 grades; the entry-level GLS and the top-spec GLS Sport. The GLS grade is powered by a 2.4L MIVEC inline-four engine, while the GLS Sport is powered by a 3.0L V6 engine both paired to an INVECS-III CVT with 6-speed sportronic mode and multi-select 4WD system.

In 2009, the GLX grade was added to the lineup, powered by the same 2.4L inline-four engine as the GLS.

In its home market of Japan it was the best-selling SUV from October 2006 to March 2007, while in the U.S. market it achieved 1,694 and 2,108 sales in November and December 2006, the first two full months it was available; Mitsubishi hoped for at least 4,000 sales per month in the United States. In Chile, where both generations were on sale simultaneously, the new model was badged Outlander K2.

Increased demand for the Lancer, and the consequent effects on the capacity of the company's Mizushima production facility, have obliged Mitsubishi to reassess production of the Outlander. In September 2007, they announced that from 2008, production of European market Outlanders would be transferred from Nagoya to its NedCar plant in the Netherlands, while the Citroën C-Crosser and Peugeot 4007 would have their production transferred from Mizushima to Nagoya.

The model was facelifted for the 2008 model year, although the 2007 grille carried over in the United States and Canada for 2008-09 until another facelift in the 2010 model year.

At the 2007 SEMA Show in Las Vegas, the company displayed a Mitsubishi Evolander (now known as Mitsubishi Outlander Ralliart) concept, powered by a 240 kW (330 PS) supercharged version of the vehicle's 6B31 V6 engine and equipped with suitably uprated suspension, brakes, wheels/tires, body kit and interior. A second show car, an Outlander GT Prototype with a front grille based on the Mitsubishi Lancer Evolution X, was exhibited at the 2009 New York International Auto Show, and formed the basis of the facelifted model introduced in late 2009.

Along with a major facelift for the 2010 model year, the top end Outlander XLS (GT in the US) introduced a new colour multi-function display and the Mitsubishi S-AWC AWD system. The lower trims retain the previous MFD and the less advanced AWC AWD system. Likewise, the interior was also slightly revised to incorporate leather into the dashboard trim and doors.

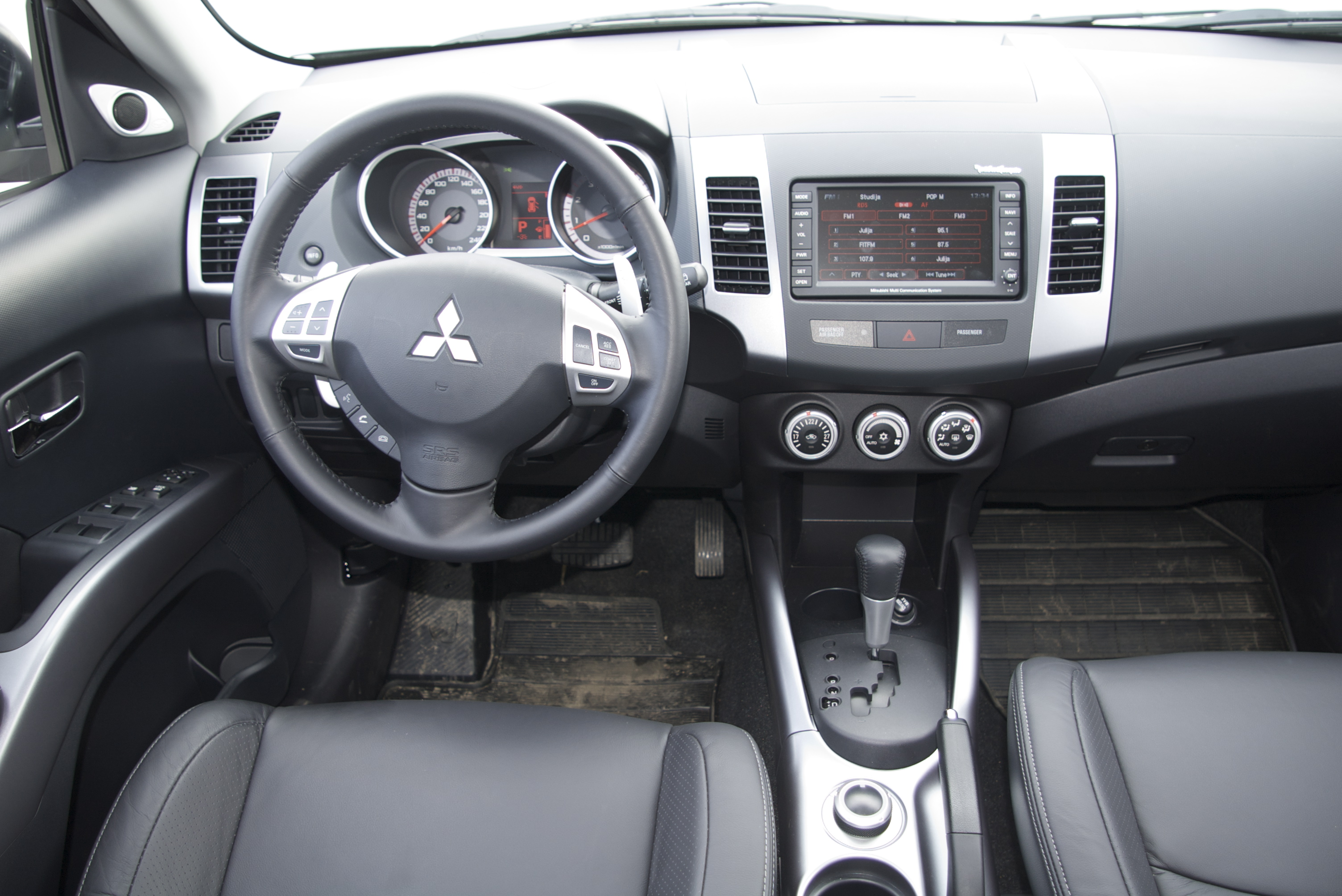
Interior

=== Gallery ===
First facelift

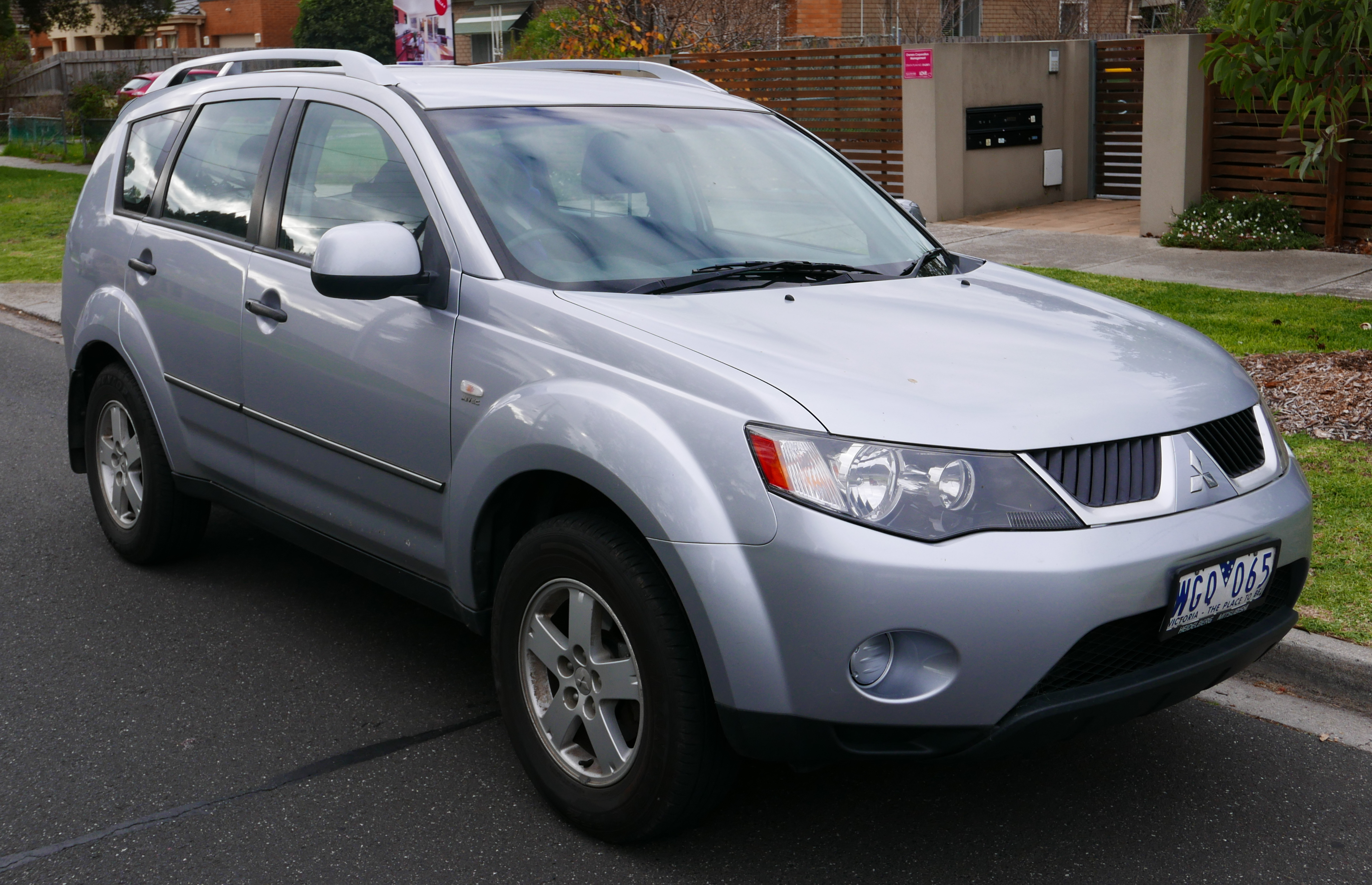
Mitsubishi Outlander LS (first facelift; Australia)

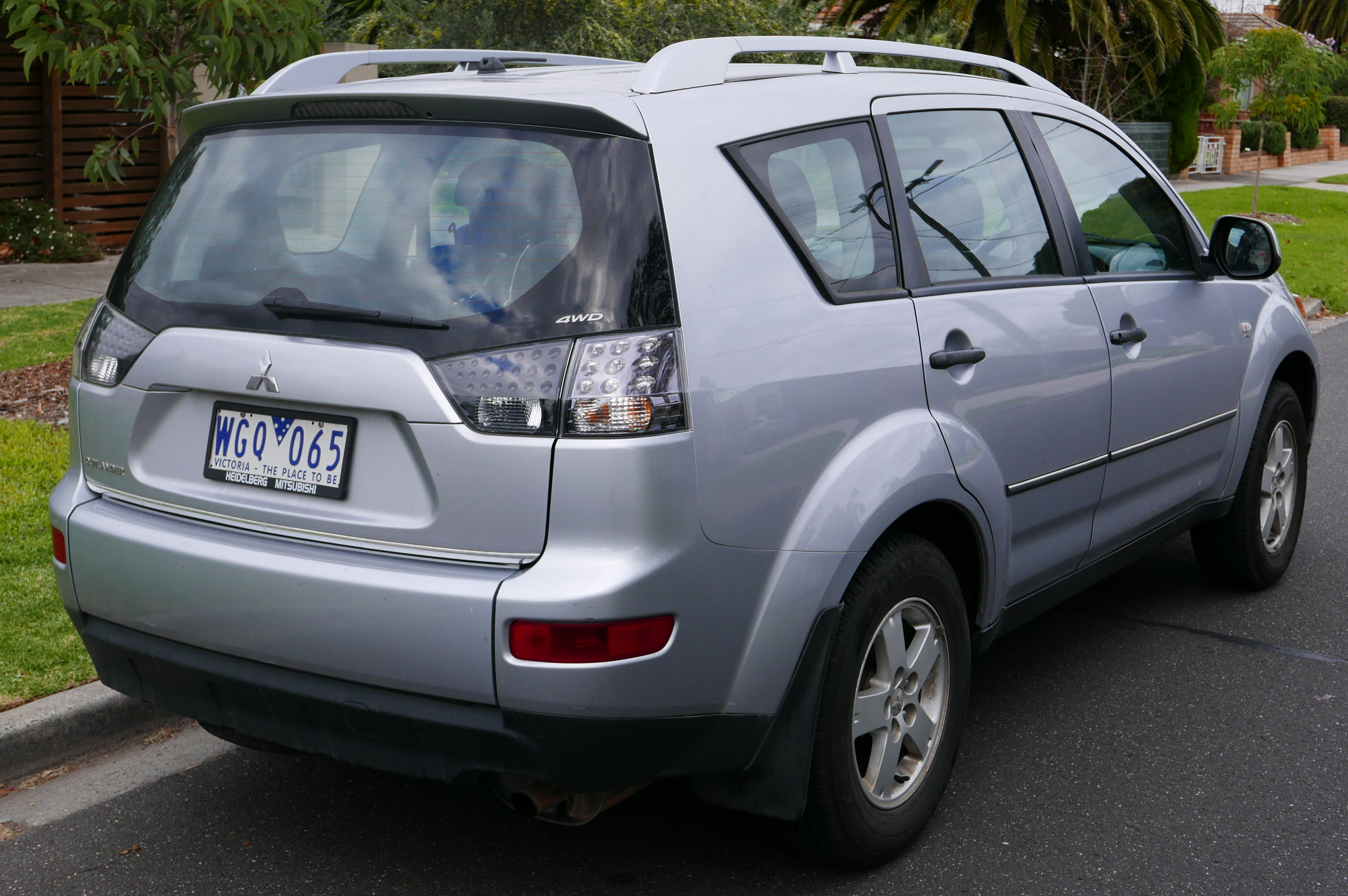
Mitsubishi Outlander LS (first facelift; Australia)

Second facelift

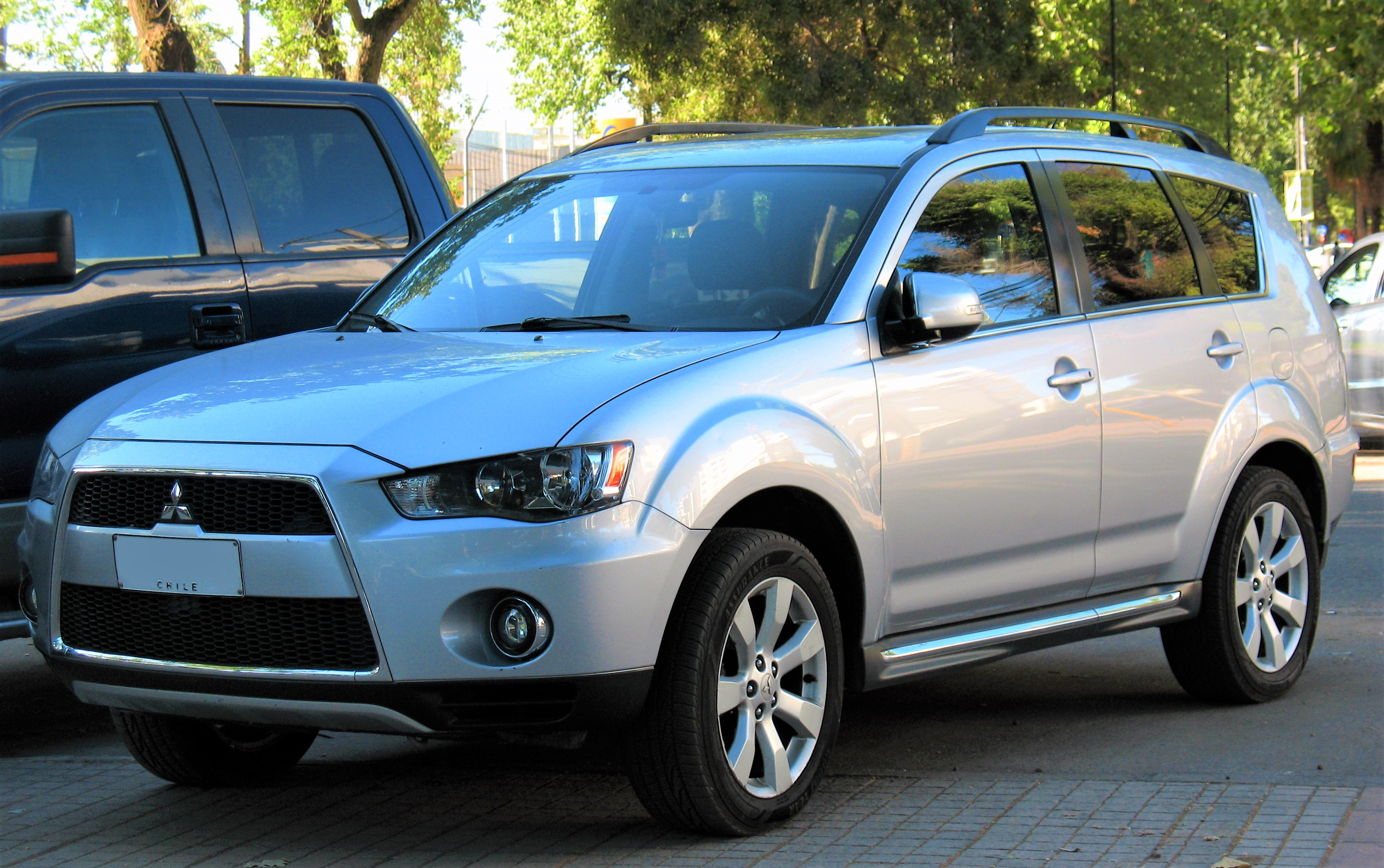
Mitsubishi Outlander (second facelift)

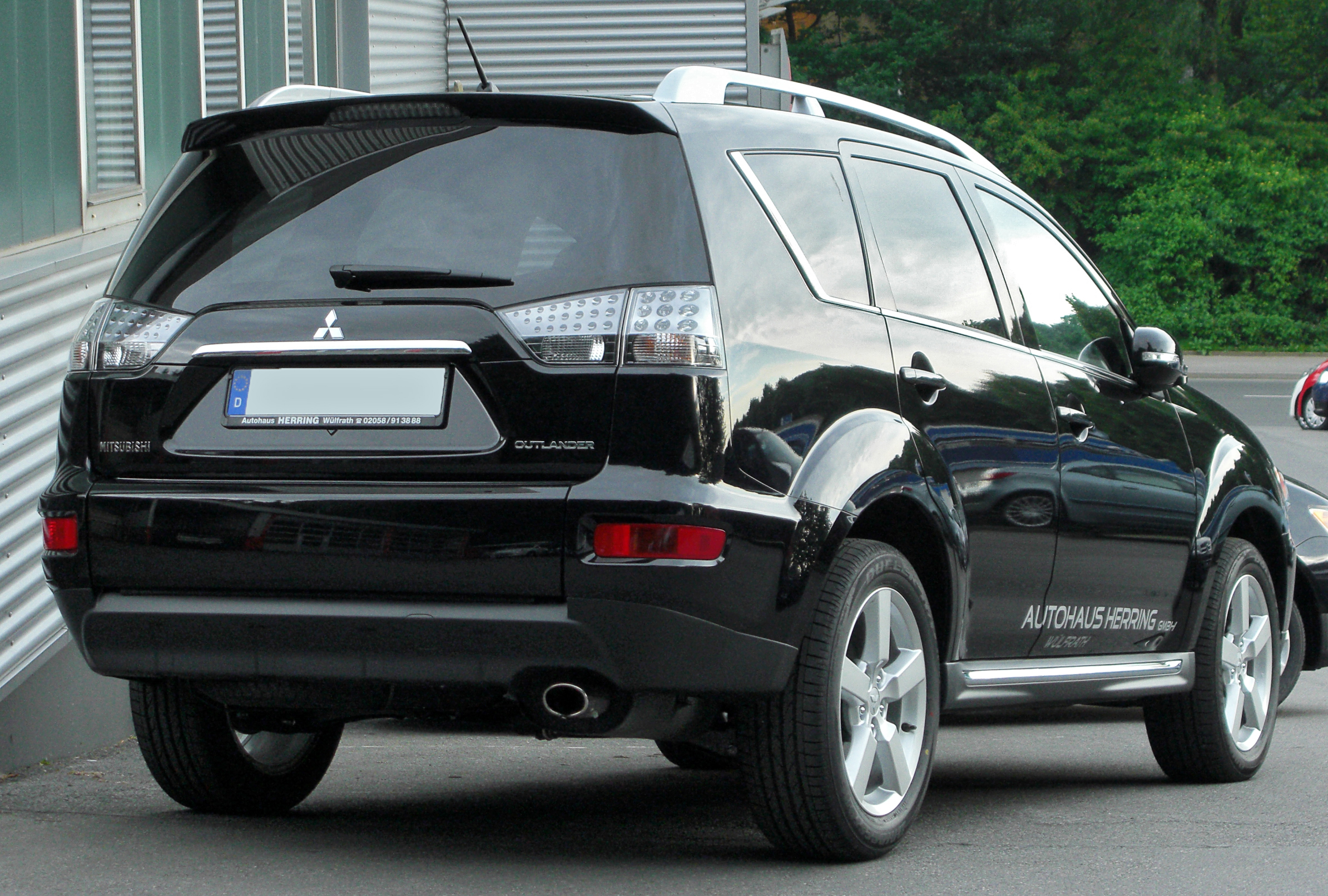
Mitsubishi Outlander (second facelift; Germany)

Second facelift (Taiwan)

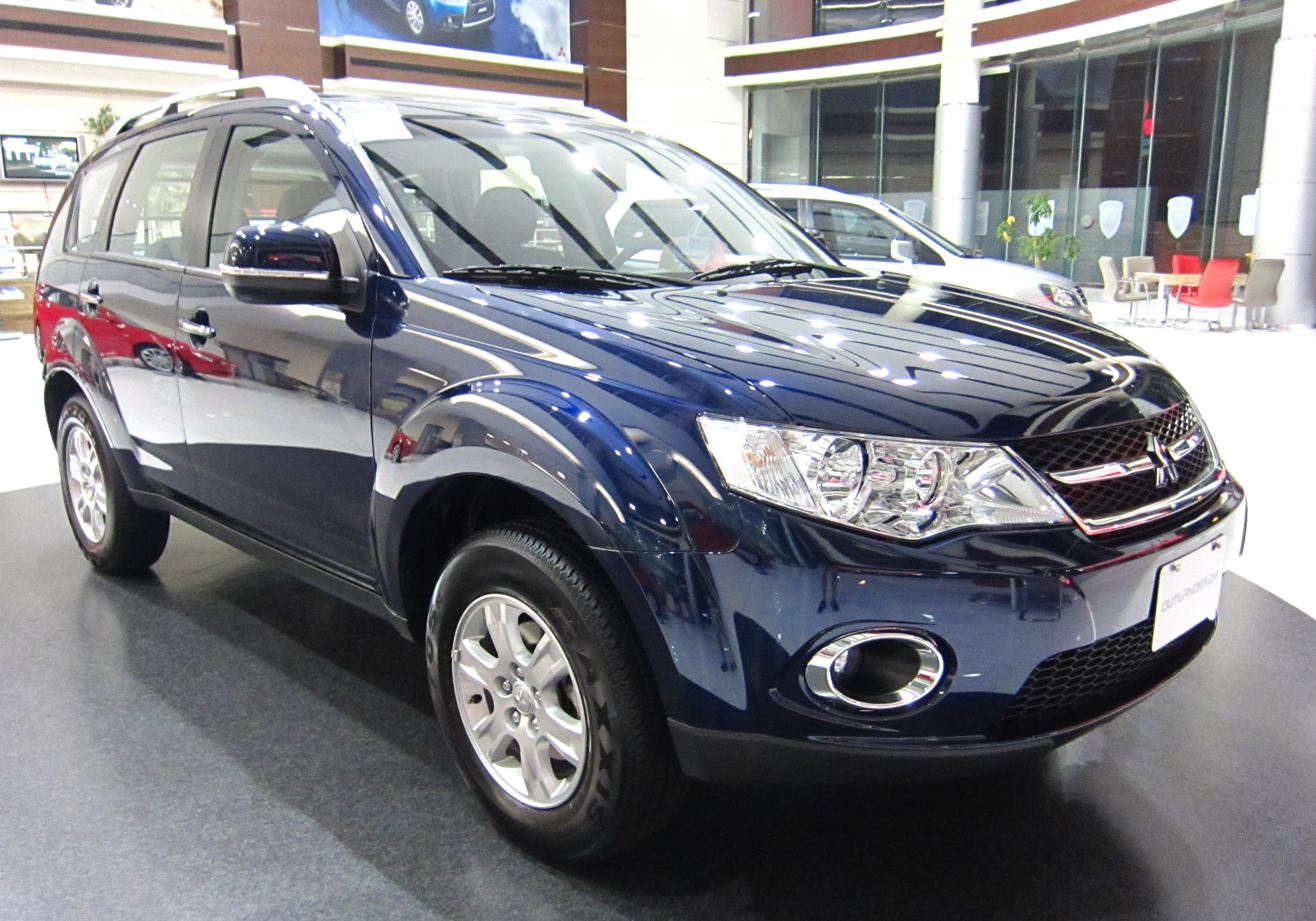
Mitsubishi Outlander (second facelift; Taiwan only)

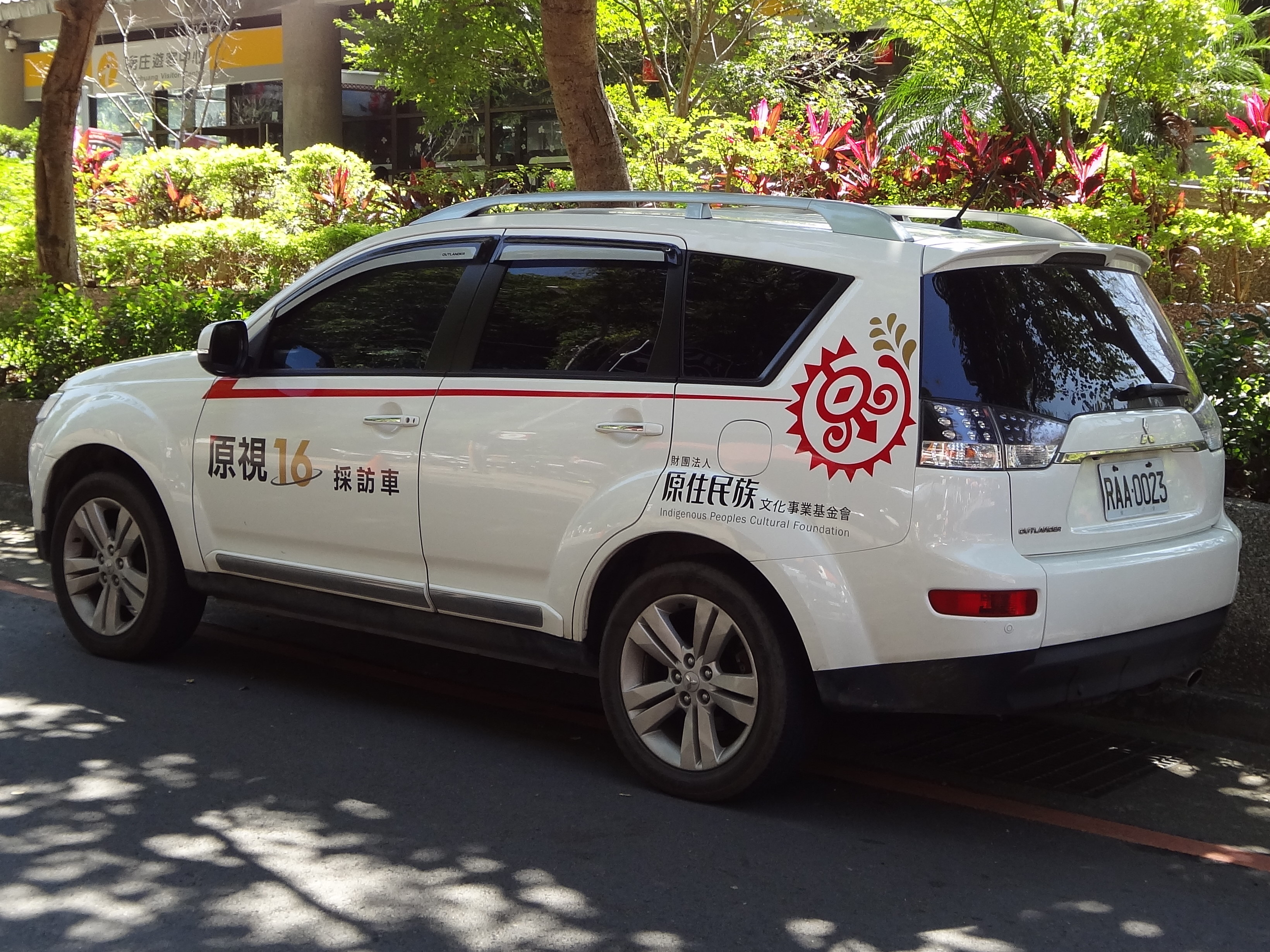
Mitsubishi Outlander (second facelift; Taiwan only)

=== Safety ===
ANCAP test results* Mitsubishi Outlander variants with dual frontal airbags (2007)
Test	Score
Overall	4 /5 stars
Frontal offset	13.29/16
Side impact	16/16
Pole	Not Assessed
Seat belt reminders	2/3
Whiplash protection	Not Assessed
Pedestrian protection	Marginal
Electronic stability control	Standard

ANCAP test results* Mitsubishi Outlander all 7-seat variants & the 5-seat VRX (2008)
Test	Score
Overall	5 /5 stars
Frontal offset	13.29/16
Side impact	16/16
Pole	2/2
Seat belt reminders	2/3
Whiplash protection	Not Assessed
Pedestrian protection	Marginal
Electronic stability control	Standard

== Third generation (GF/GG/ZJ/ZK/ZL; 2012) ==
Third generation
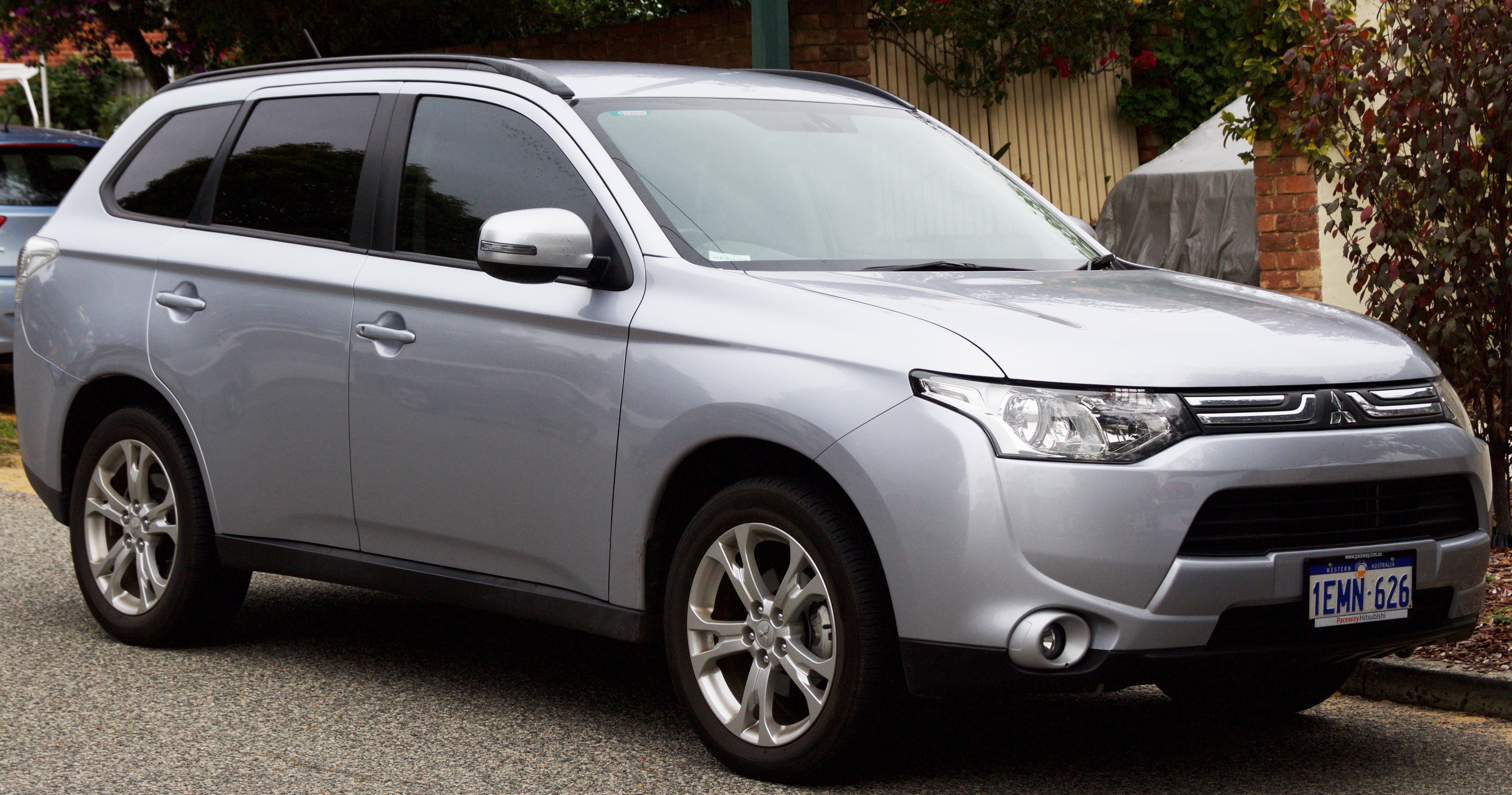
- Mitsubishi Outlander (pre-facelift)

Overview
- Model code: GF; GG; ZJ; ZK; ZL
- Production: 2012–2024; 2014–2026 (Taiwan)
- Model years: 2013–2021
- Assembly: Japan: Okazaki, Aichi (Nagoya Plant); Sakahogi, Gifu (Pajero Manufacturing Co., Ltd.); China: Changsha (GMMC: until 2023); Malaysia: Kuala Lumpur (TCMA); Russia: Kaluga (PCMA Rus); Taiwan: Taoyuan (CMC); Thailand: Laem Chabang (MMTh, PHEV); Vietnam: Dĩ An, Bình Dương (MMV)
- Designer: Hideaki Kanazawa; Norihiko Yoshimine and Yuichiro Ishizuka (2015 facelift)

Body and chassis
- Platform: Mitsubishi GS platform
- Related: Mitsubishi RVR/ASX/Outlander Sport; Mitsubishi Eclipse Cross

Powertrain
- Engine: Petrol: 2.0 L 4J11 SOHC MIVEC I4; 2.4 L 4B12 DOHC MIVEC I4; 2.4 L 4J12 SOHC MIVEC I4; 3.0 L 6B31 SOHC MIVEC V6; Petrol PHEV: 2.0 L 4B11 I4; 2.4 L 4B12 I4; Diesel: 2.3 L 4N14 DI-D DOHC MIVEC I4 turbo
- Electric motor: Meiden S61 / Y61 AC Synchronous Permanent Magnetic Motor (PHEV Version)
- Transmission: 5-speed manual 6-speed manual 6-speed automatic Jatco INVECS-III CVT6; GKN Multi-Mode eTransmission (PHEV)
- Battery: 12 kWh Li-ion (MY2016–2018); 13.8 kWh Li-ion (MY2019–2021)

Dimensions
- Wheelbase: 2,670 mm (105.1 in)
- Length: 4,695 mm (184.8 in)
- Width: 1,810 mm (71.3 in)
- Height: 1,710 mm (67.3 in)
- Curb weight: 1,395–1,820 kg (3,075–4,012 lb)

Mitsubishi unveiled the third-generation Outlander at the 2012 Geneva Motor Show. The production version of the Outlander was debuted in Russia in July 2012, and was introduced in other European markets in September 2012. While the new vehicle was introduced to North America at the November 2012 LA Auto Show it was not available for purchase until early 2014. North American Outlanders continued on the second-generation platform through model year 2013. However, the third generation Outlander are not sold in the Philippine market due to poor sales, in favor of the third-row Mitsubishi Montero Sport.

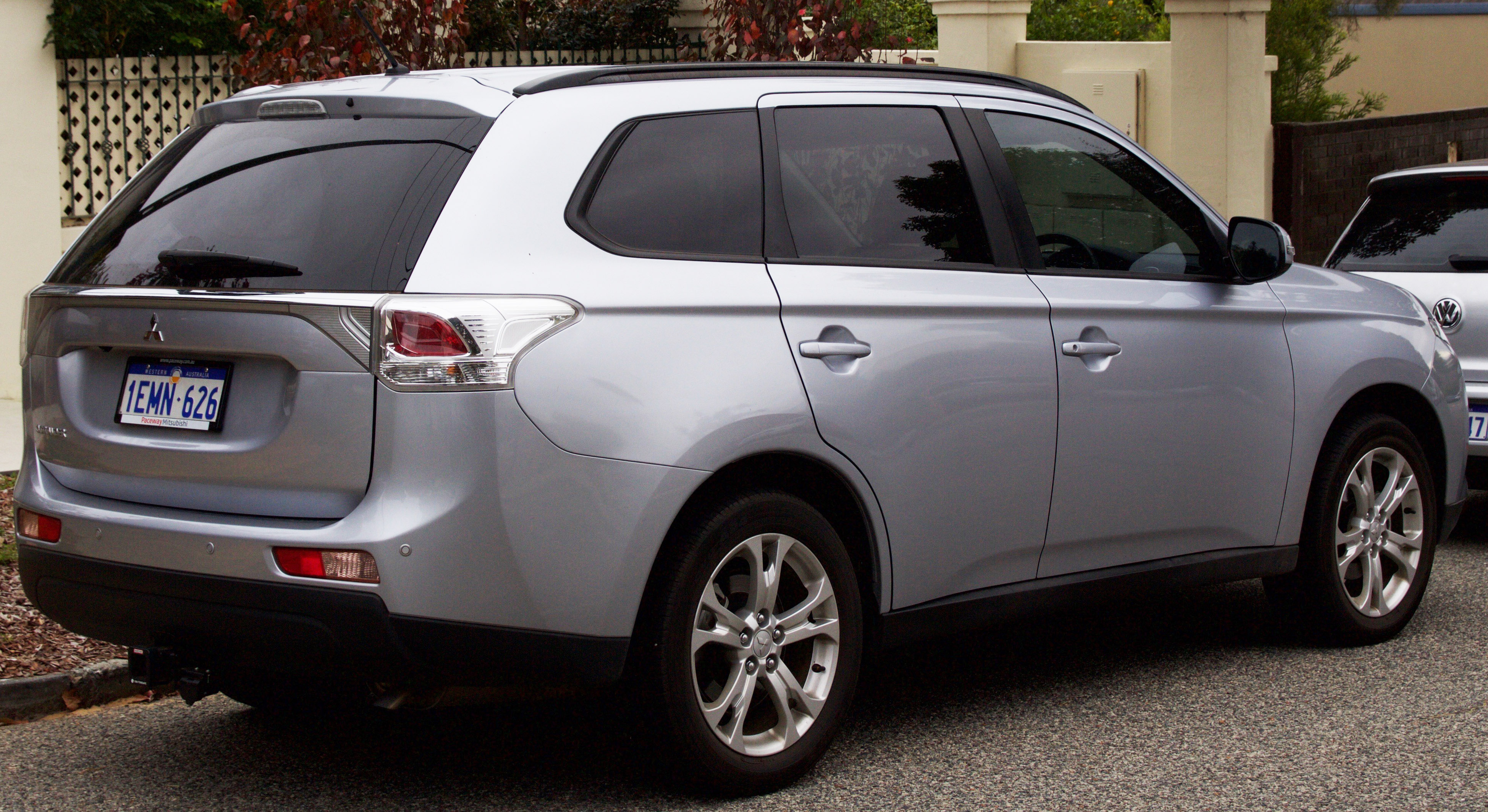
Rear view

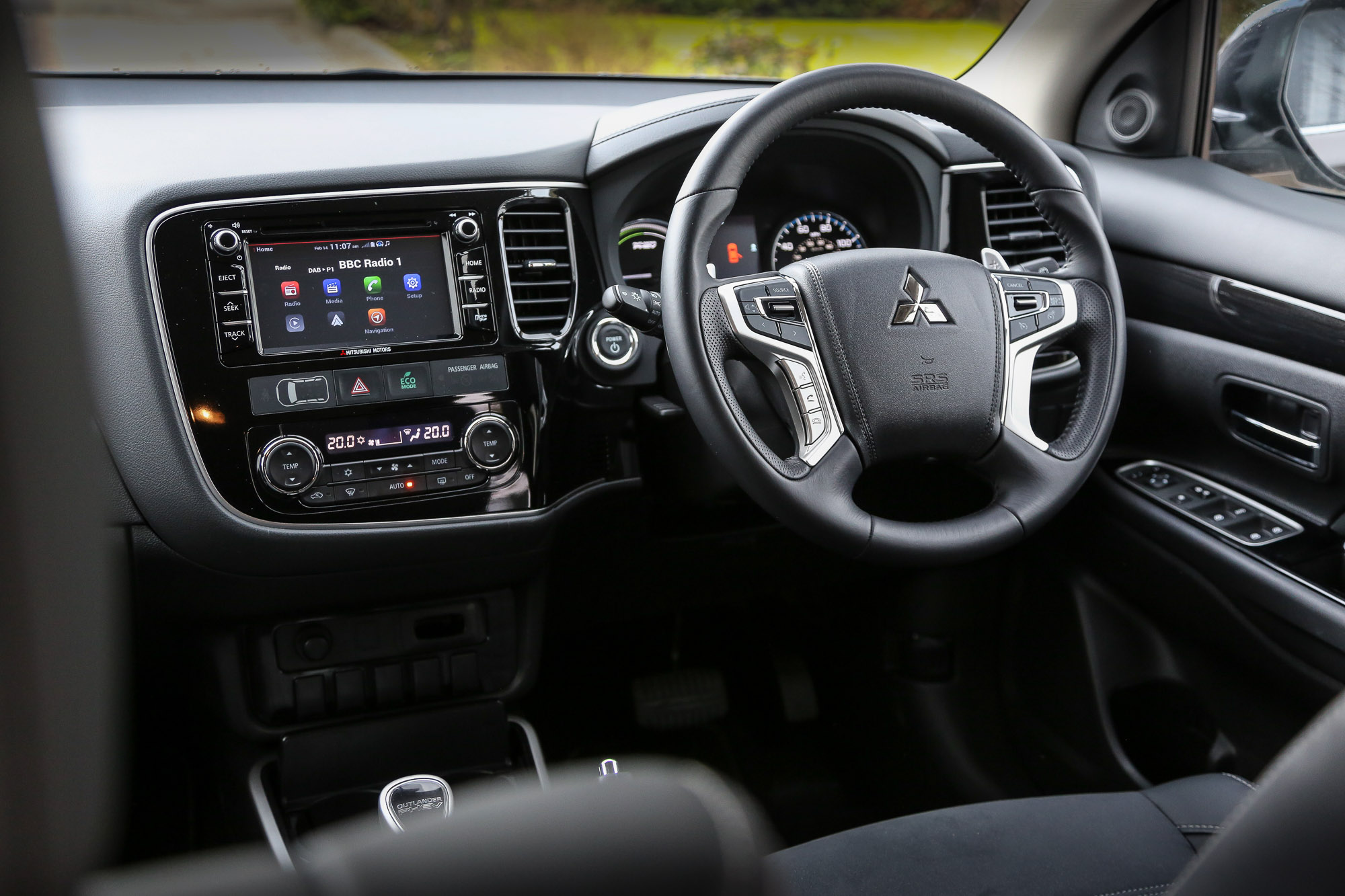
Interior

The redesigned model has a new lightweight body that weighs approximately 200 pounds (90 kg) less than the previous model due to extensive use of high tensile strength steel. With a lower drag coefficient of c_{d} 0.33, fuel economy has been improved over the previous model. Inside, the dashboard and front doors are covered with soft touch material, the seats are redesigned, and there is good sound insulation.

The front suspension consists of MacPherson struts with a stabilizer bar, and the rear suspension is a multi-link design with a stabilizer bar. Electric Power Steering reduces load on the engine compared to a hydraulic system and helps to improve fuel economy. Disc brakes are installed on all four wheels, with 11.6 in (294 mm) vented rotors in front along with 11.9 in (302 mm) solid rotors in back.

Newly available safety features include a Forward Collision Mitigation system, a Lane departure warning system, a driver knee airbag to reduce leg injury in a crash, and adaptive cruise control. In addition, the Outlander has standard driver and passenger front airbags, front side torso airbags along with curtain airbags, ABS with EBD, Traction Control Logic, Active Stability Control, Hill Start Assist, and a brake pedal that recedes to prevent leg injury in a crash.

In crash tests conducted by the Insurance Institute for Highway Safety, the Outlander received a top score of "Good" in every category. When equipped with the optional Forward Collision Mitigation system, the car received the institute's Top Safety Pick+ award. The vehicle also received full five star overall ratings in the United States, Japanese, and European New Car Assessment Programs.

The third generation Mitsubishi Outlander was launched in Malaysia in April 2016 with a 2.4-litre engine and being fully imported. In September 2017, a 2.0-litre engine locally assembled variant debuted before being for sale in October 2018. In January 2018, the 2.4-litre engine variant became more affordable due to local assembly. In October 2018, a limited edition 'Sports Edition' limited to 120 units based on the 2.0-litre engine variant became available and featured dual-tone paint.

=== First facelift ===
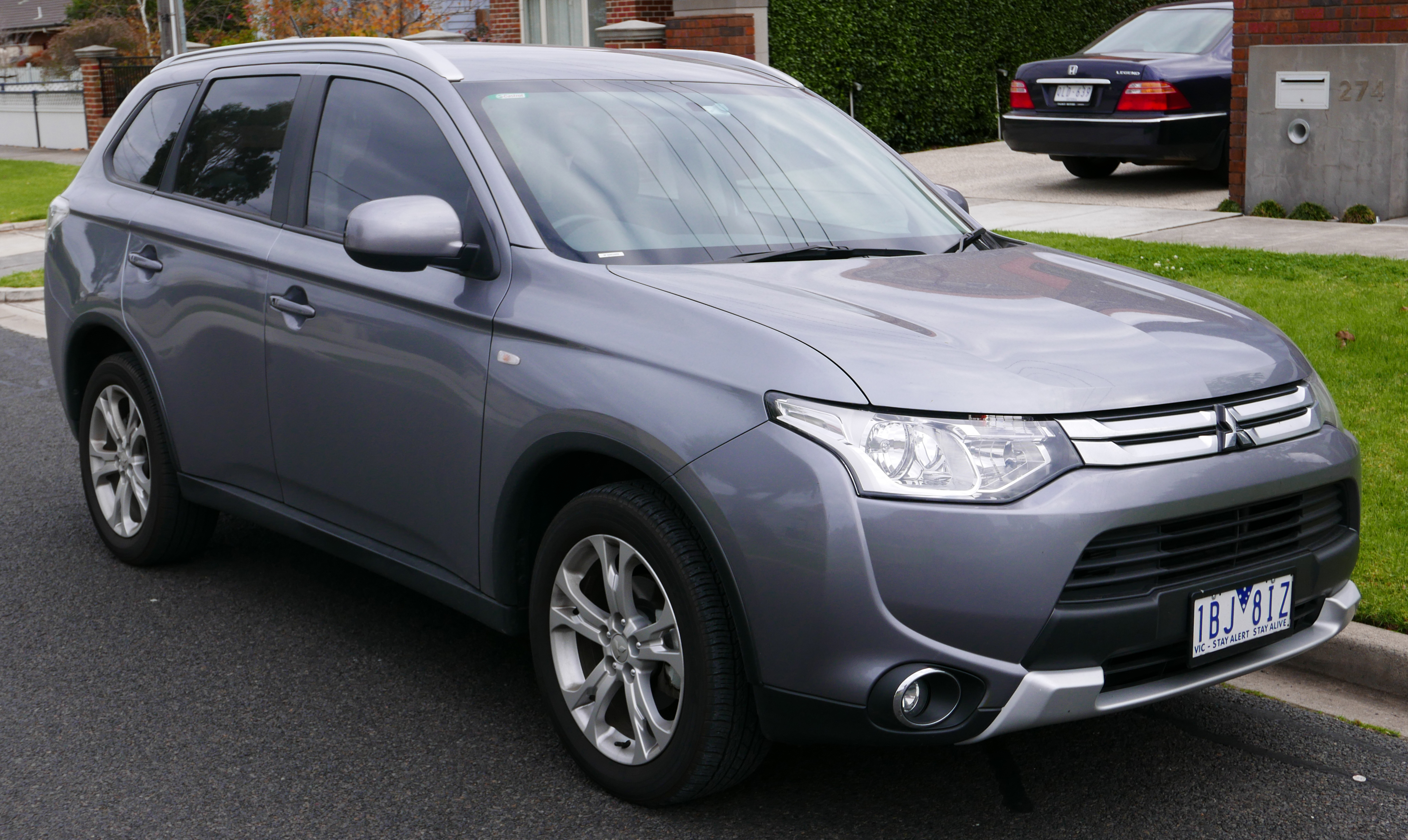
Mitsubishi Outlander ES (2014 update)

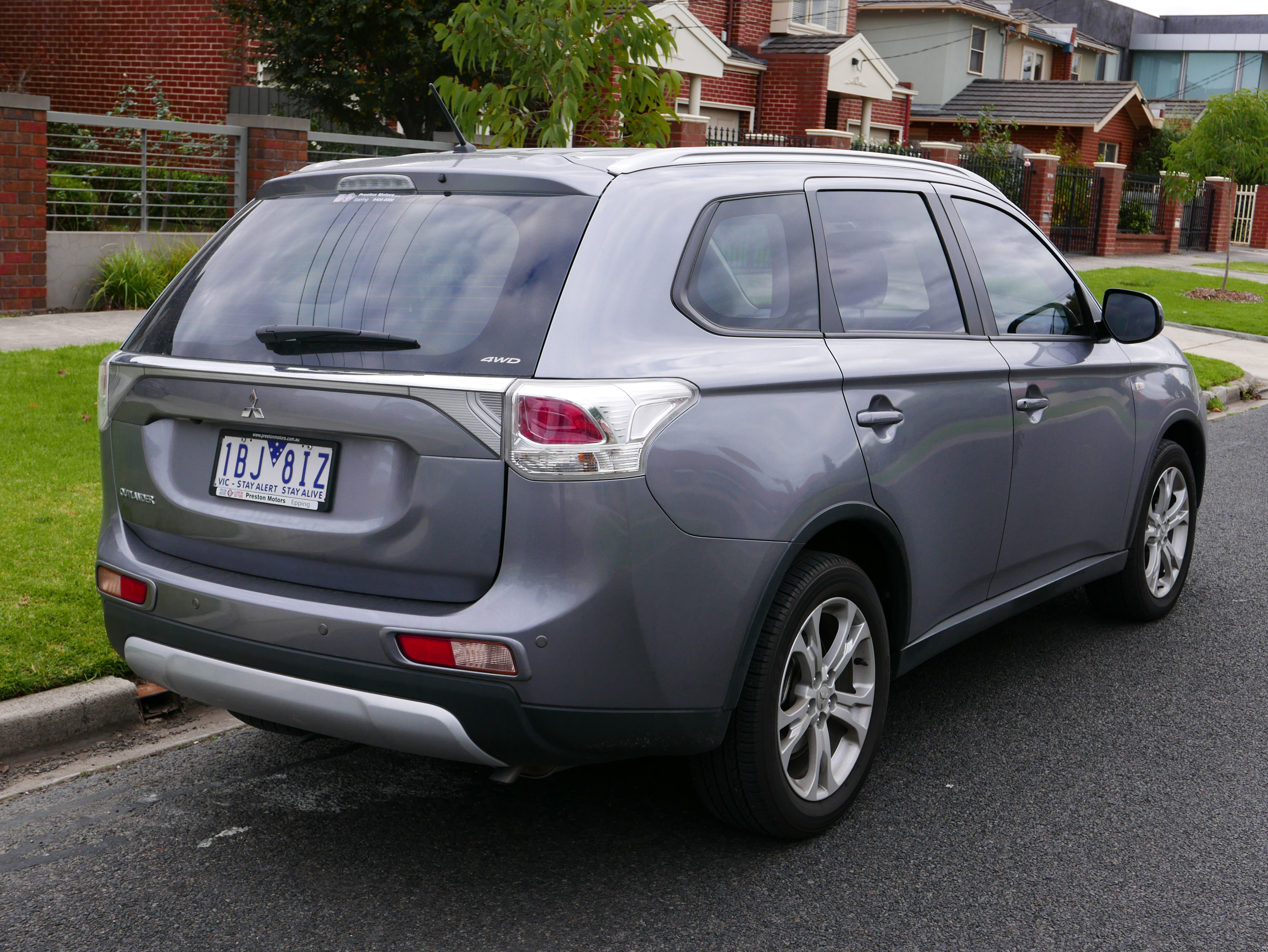
Mitsubishi Outlander ES (2014 update)

=== Second facelift ===
At the 2015 New York International Auto Show, Mitsubishi debuted a heavily revised Outlander for the 2016 model year. The vehicle features new design language called "Dynamic Shield" that will be the basis for future vehicles in different segments. The revised headlights now include LED DRLs with the option of full LED headlights. Inside the cabin, Mitsubishi made refinements to the steering wheel, headliner, rear folding seats, and door controls.

Besides cosmetic changes, the updated Outlander has somewhat reduced cabin noise via increased use of sound insulation, thicker door glass, dynamic suspension and differential dampers, and thicker weatherstripping. The suspension and steering are re-tuned and a new generation Jatco CVT8 transmission introduced for four-cylinder models. The revised SUV first went on sale in Russia in April 2015, followed by the Australia in June and Canada and the Caribbean in July.

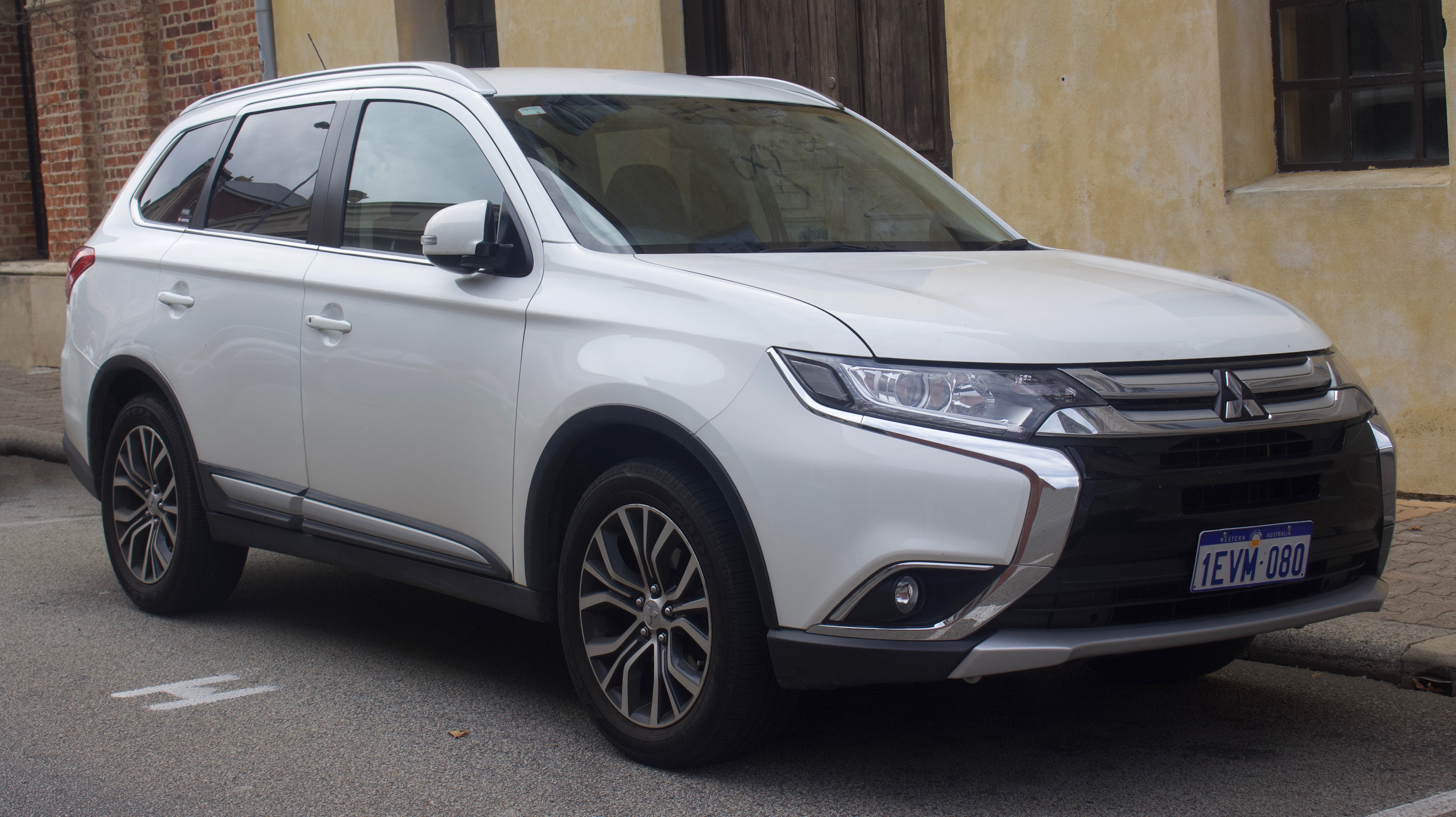
Mitsubishi Outlander LS (2015 facelift)

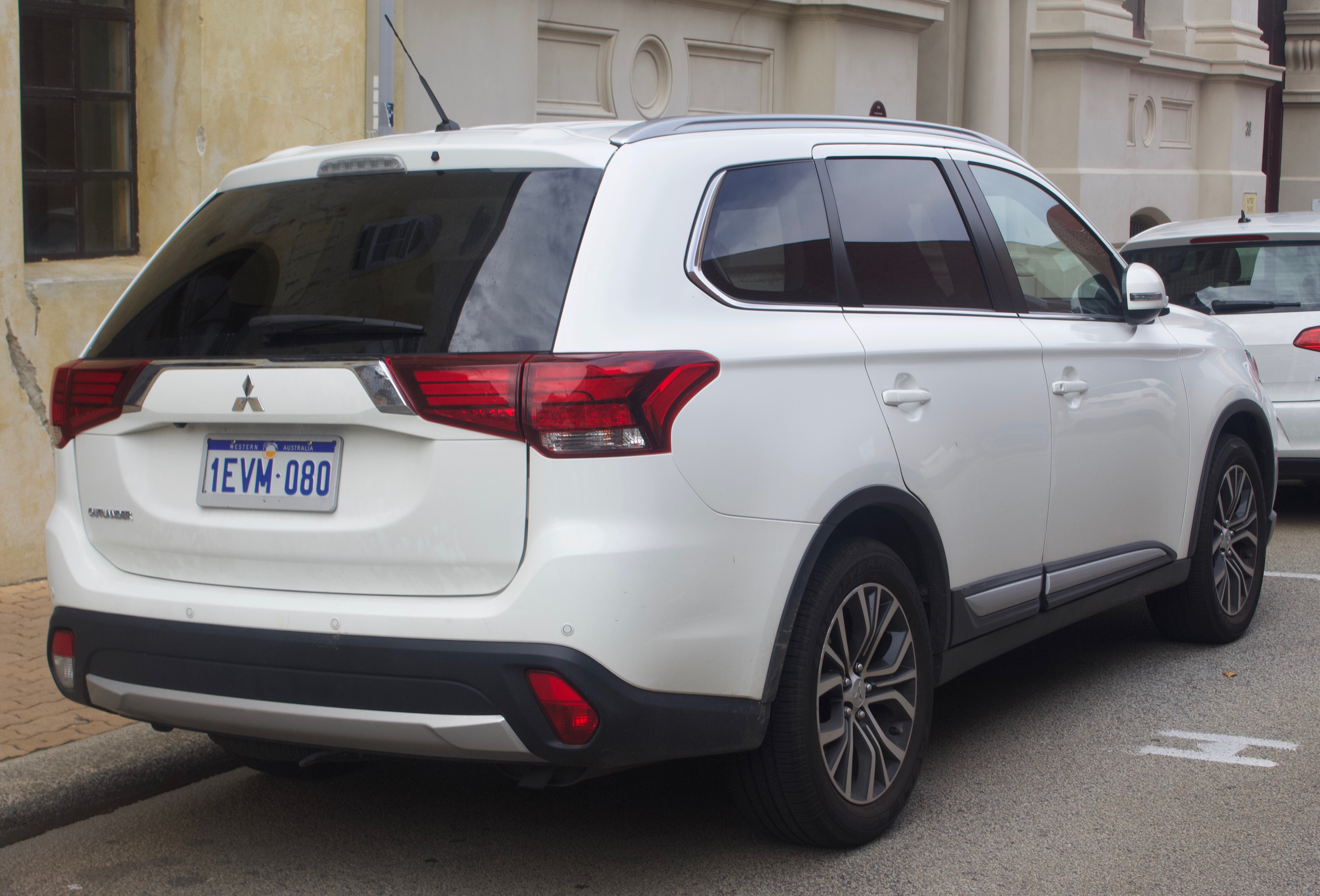
Mitsubishi Outlander LS (2015 facelift)

=== Third facelift ===
The Outlander received another facelift for the 2019 model year. Changes included a new twin blade grille that contains black inserts, revised front and rear bumper design, and new 18-inch alloy wheels.

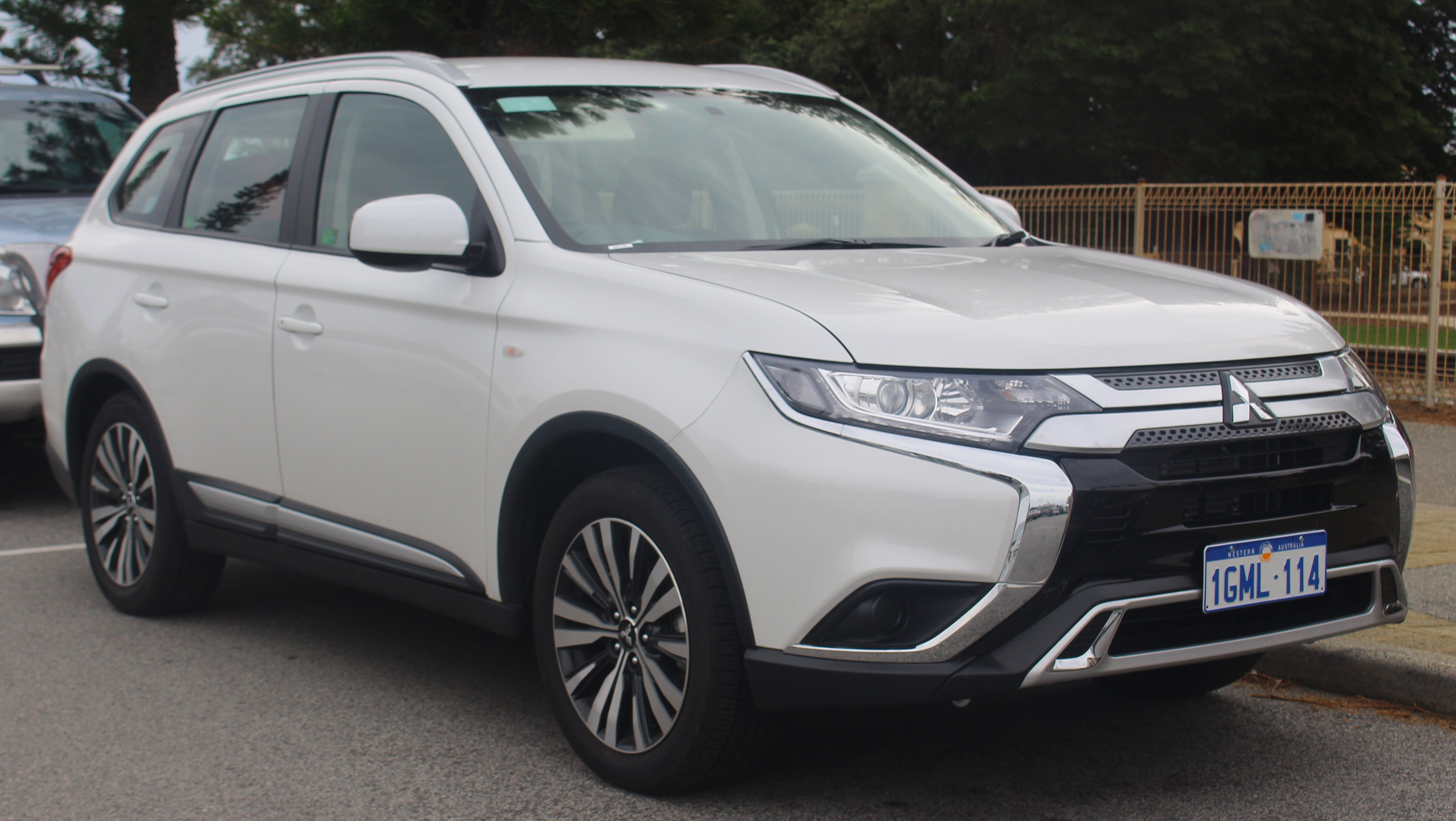
Mitsubishi Outlander ES (2018 facelift)

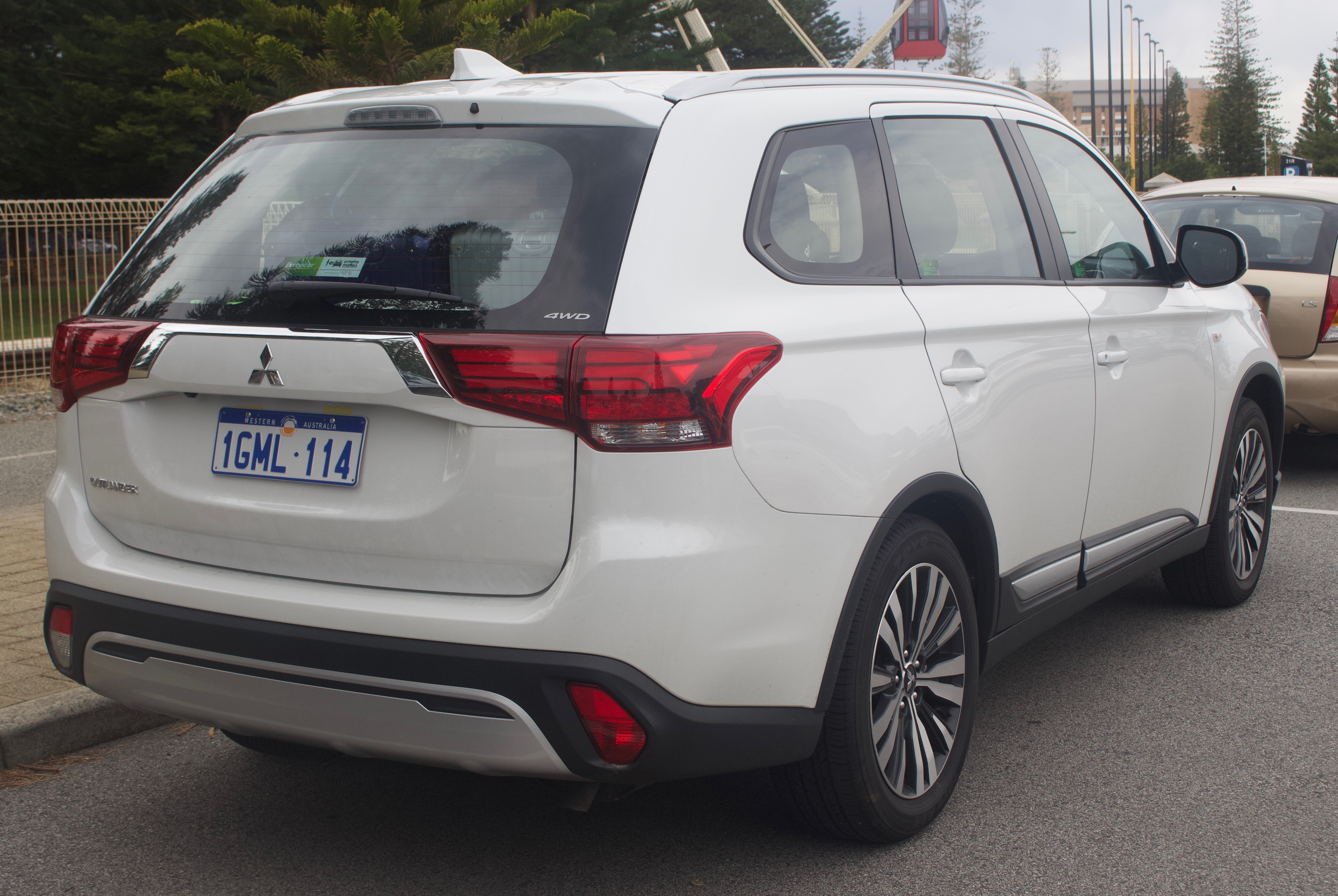
Mitsubishi Outlander ES (2018 facelift)

=== Outlander PHEV ===
The third generation includes a plug-in hybrid variant, called PHEV, and its production version was unveiled at the 2012 Paris Motor Show. According to JATO Dynamics, the Outlander PHEV was once the world's all-time best selling plug-in hybrid since December 2018.

==== Pre-facelift ====
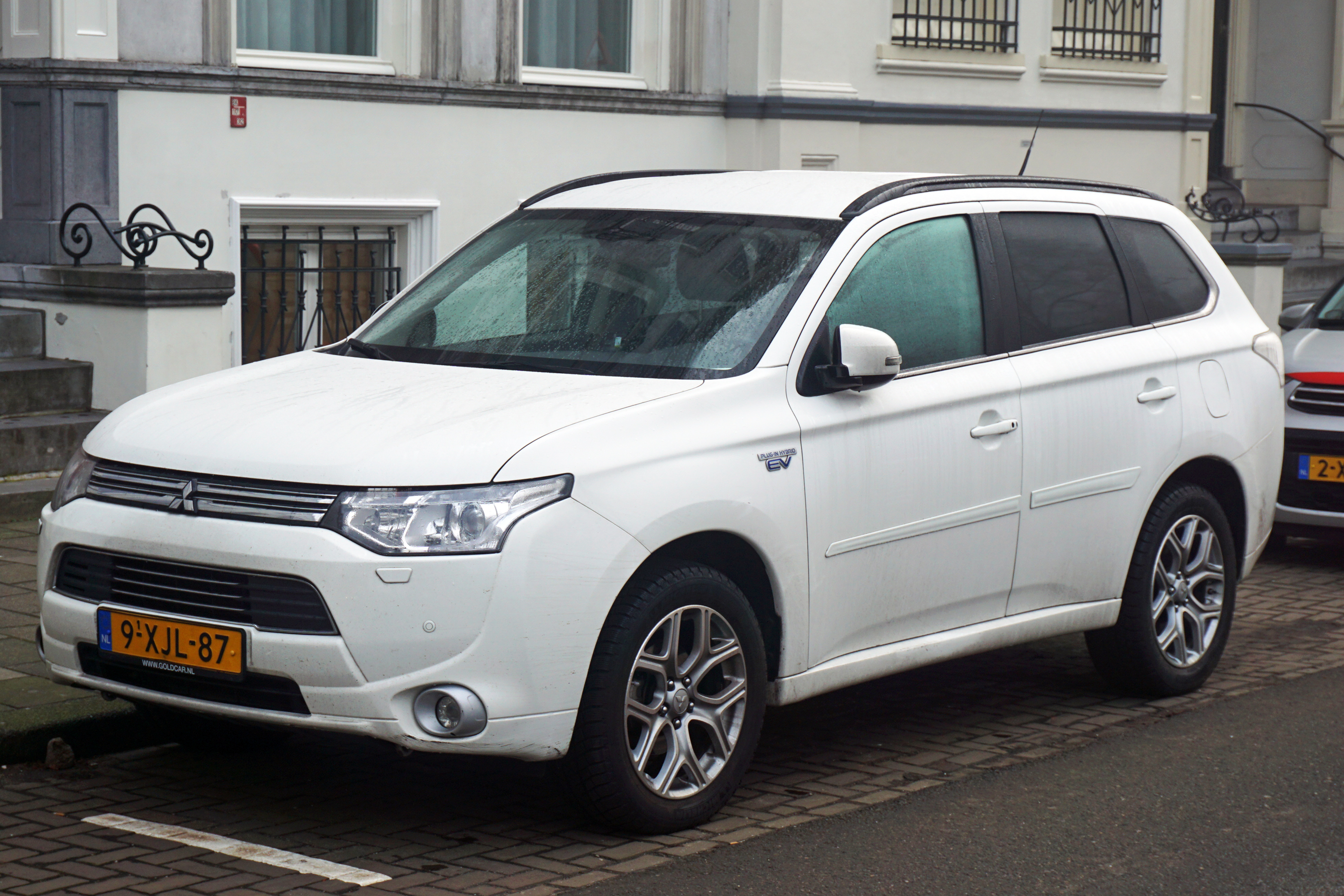
Mitsubishi Outlander PHEV (pre-facelift)

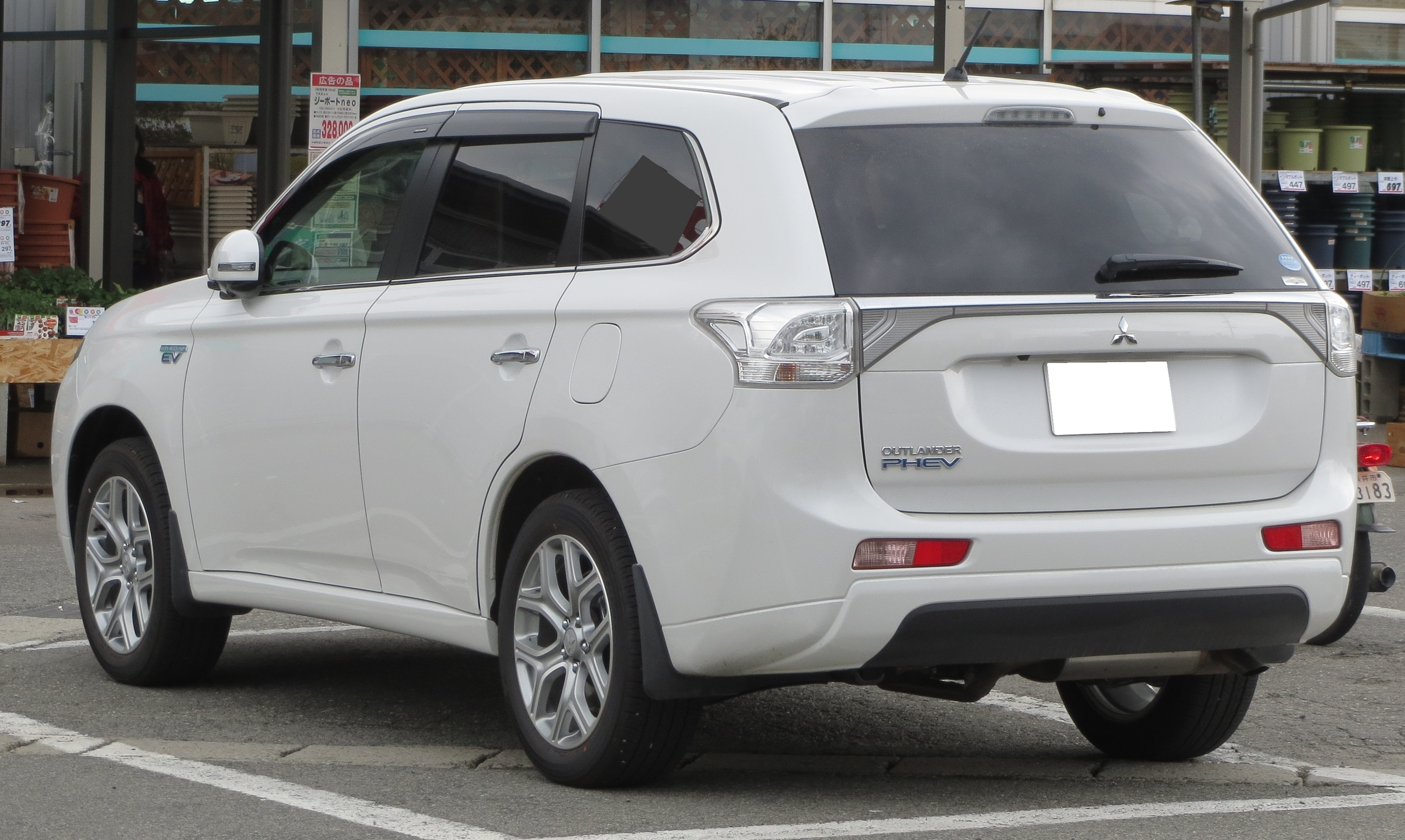
Mitsubishi Outlander PHEV (pre-facelift)

==== First facelift ====
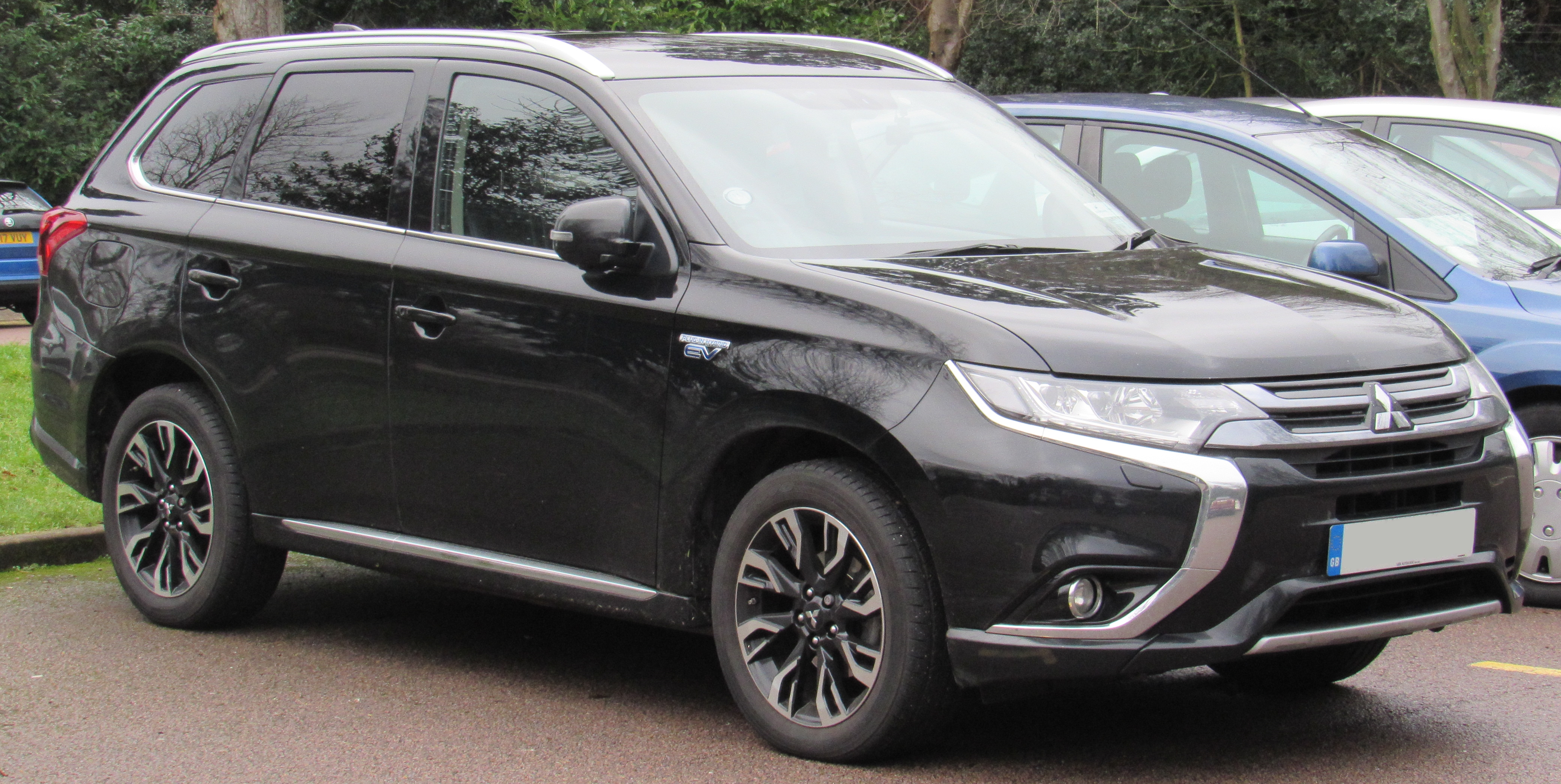
Mitsubishi Outlander PHEV (first facelift)

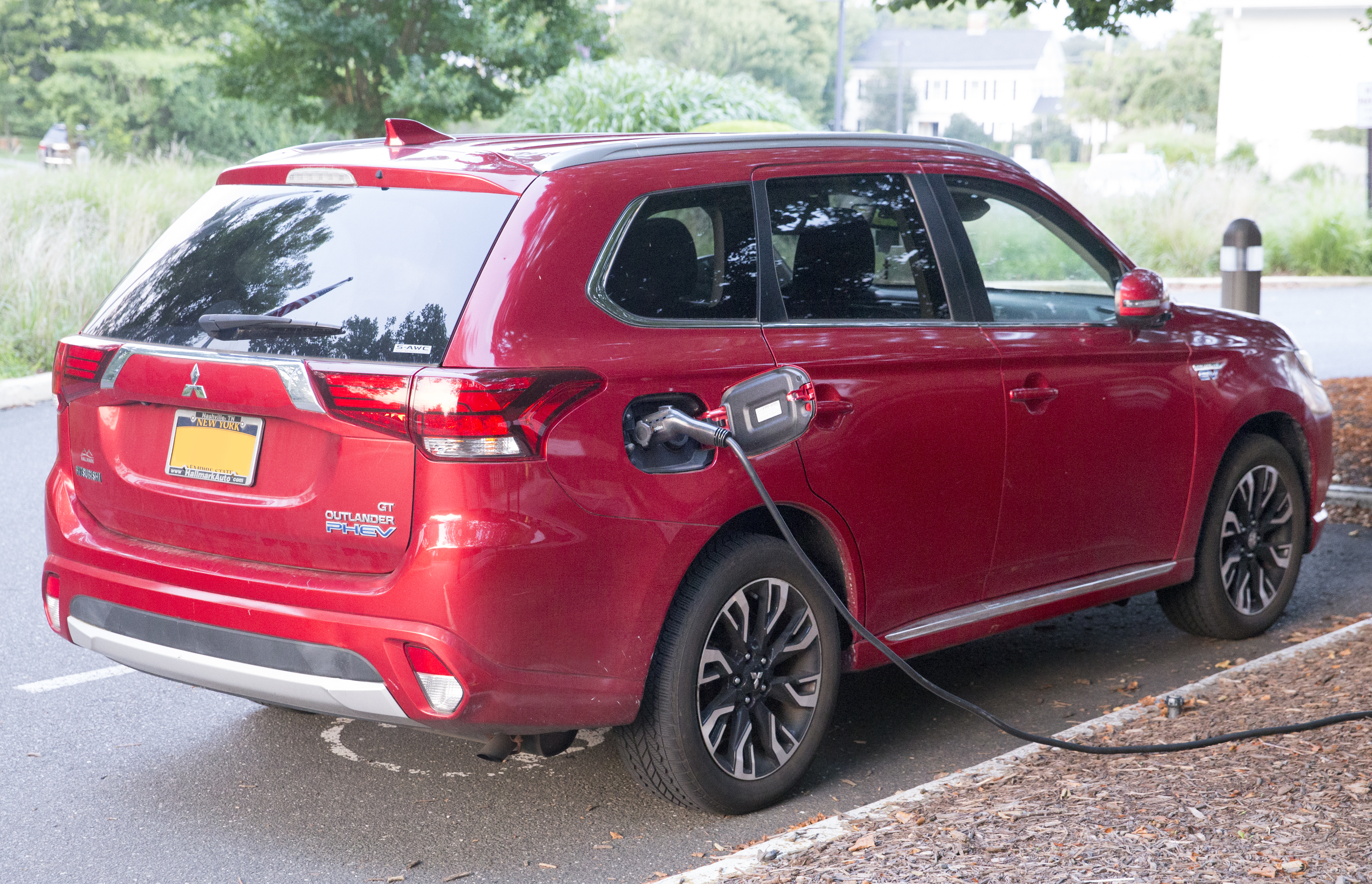
Rear view, charging (first facelift)

==== Second facelift ====
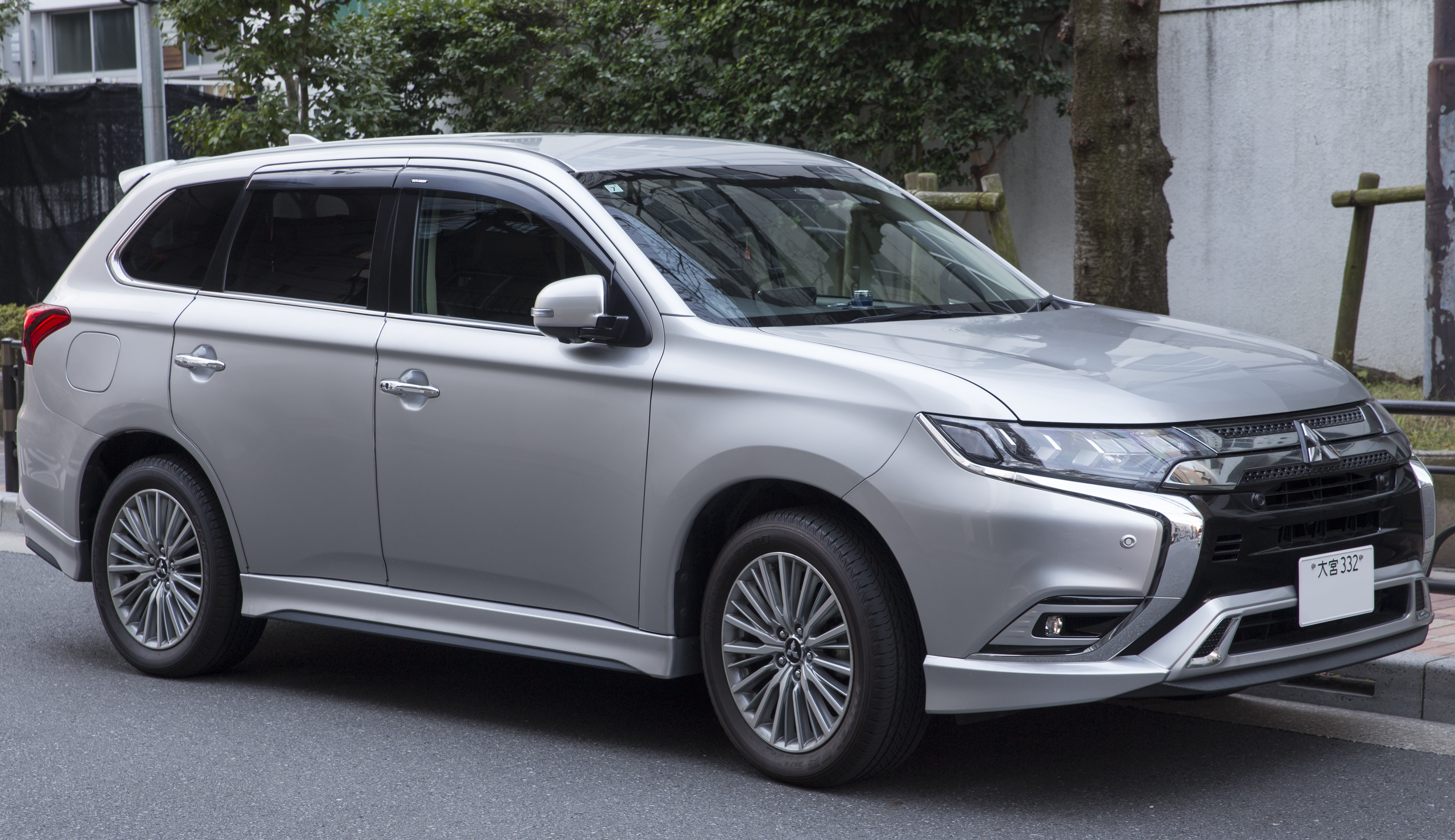
Mitsubishi Outlander PHEV (second facelift)

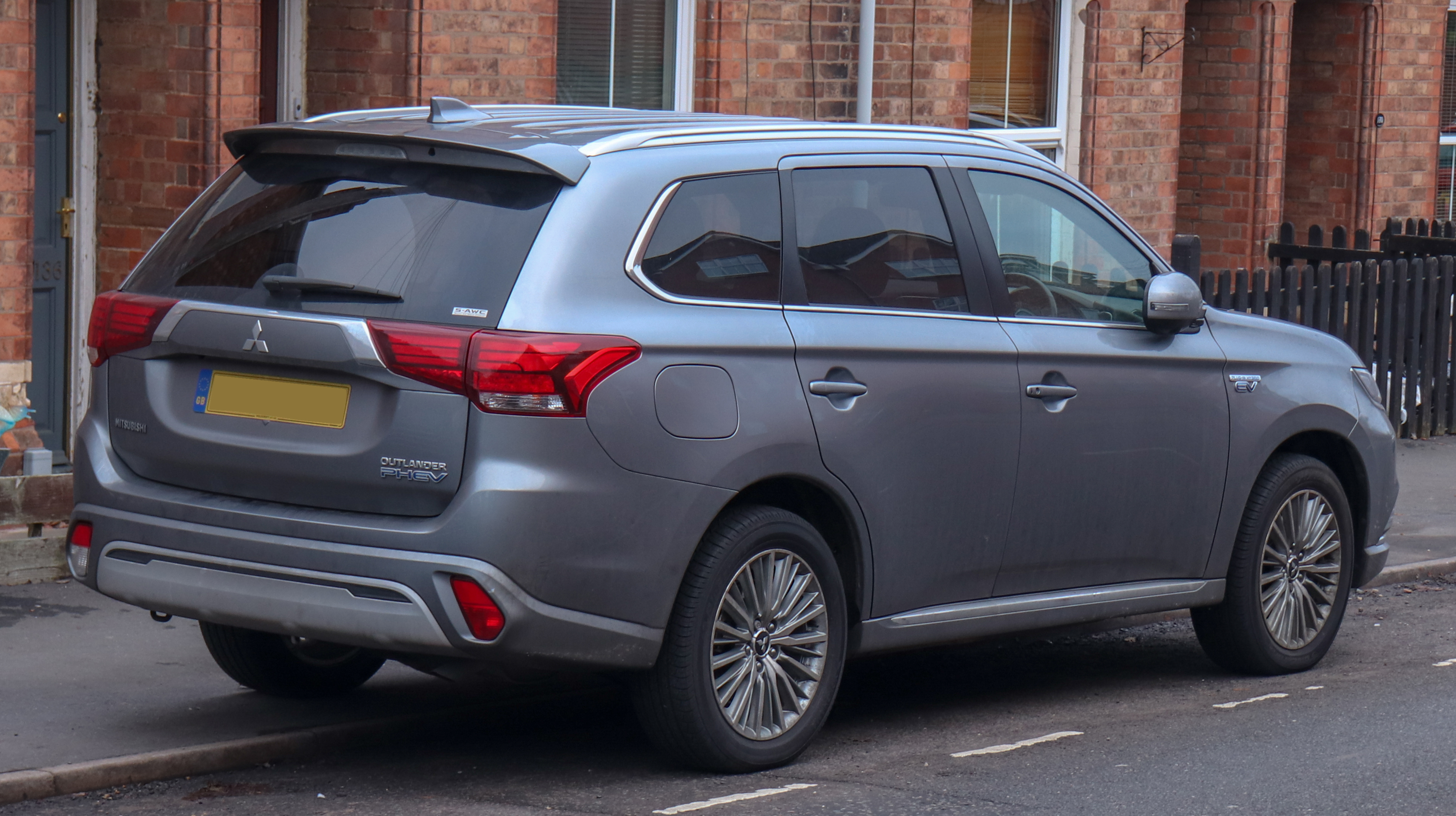
Mitsubishi Outlander PHEV (second facelift)

==== Specifications ====
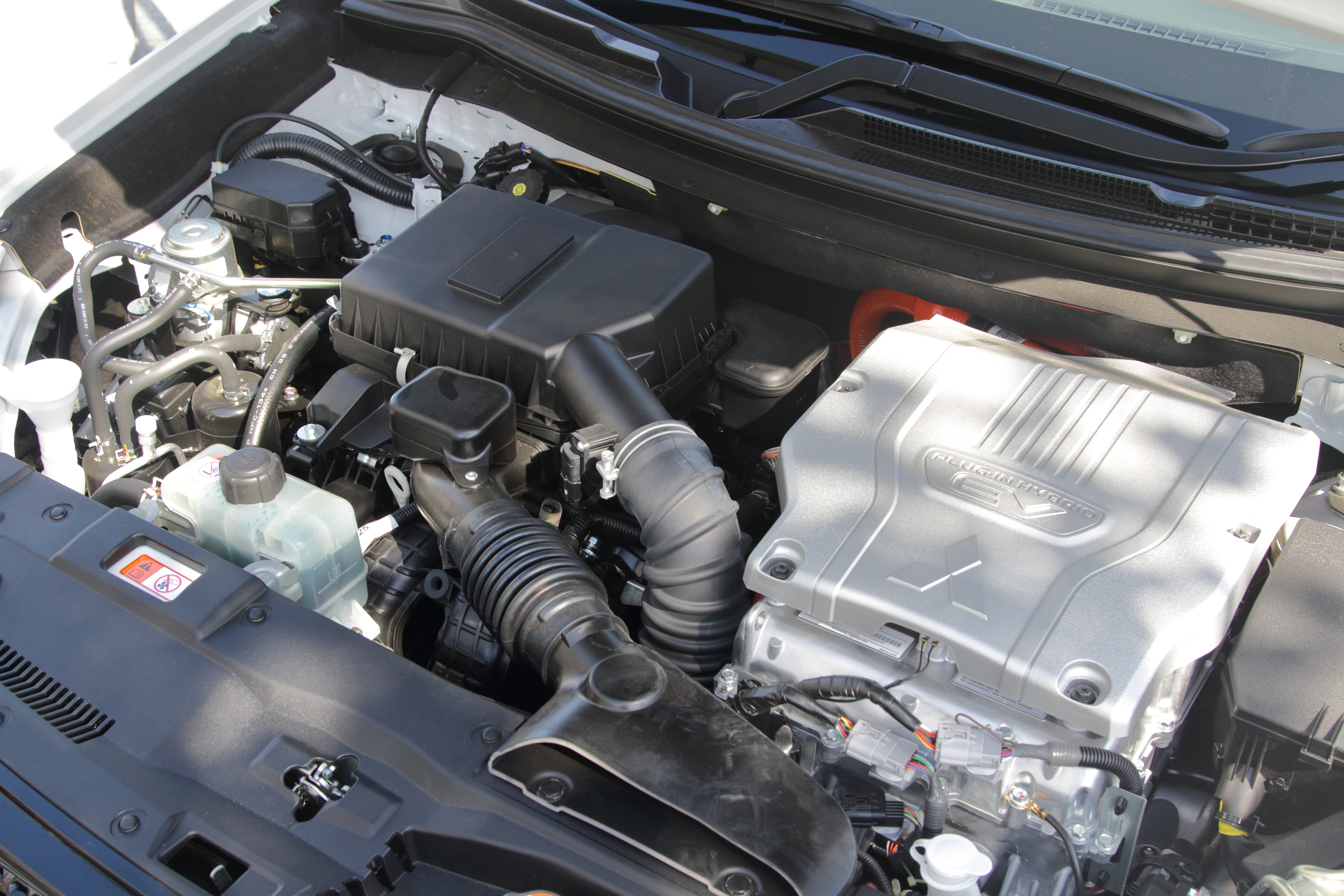
Outlander PHEV powertrain

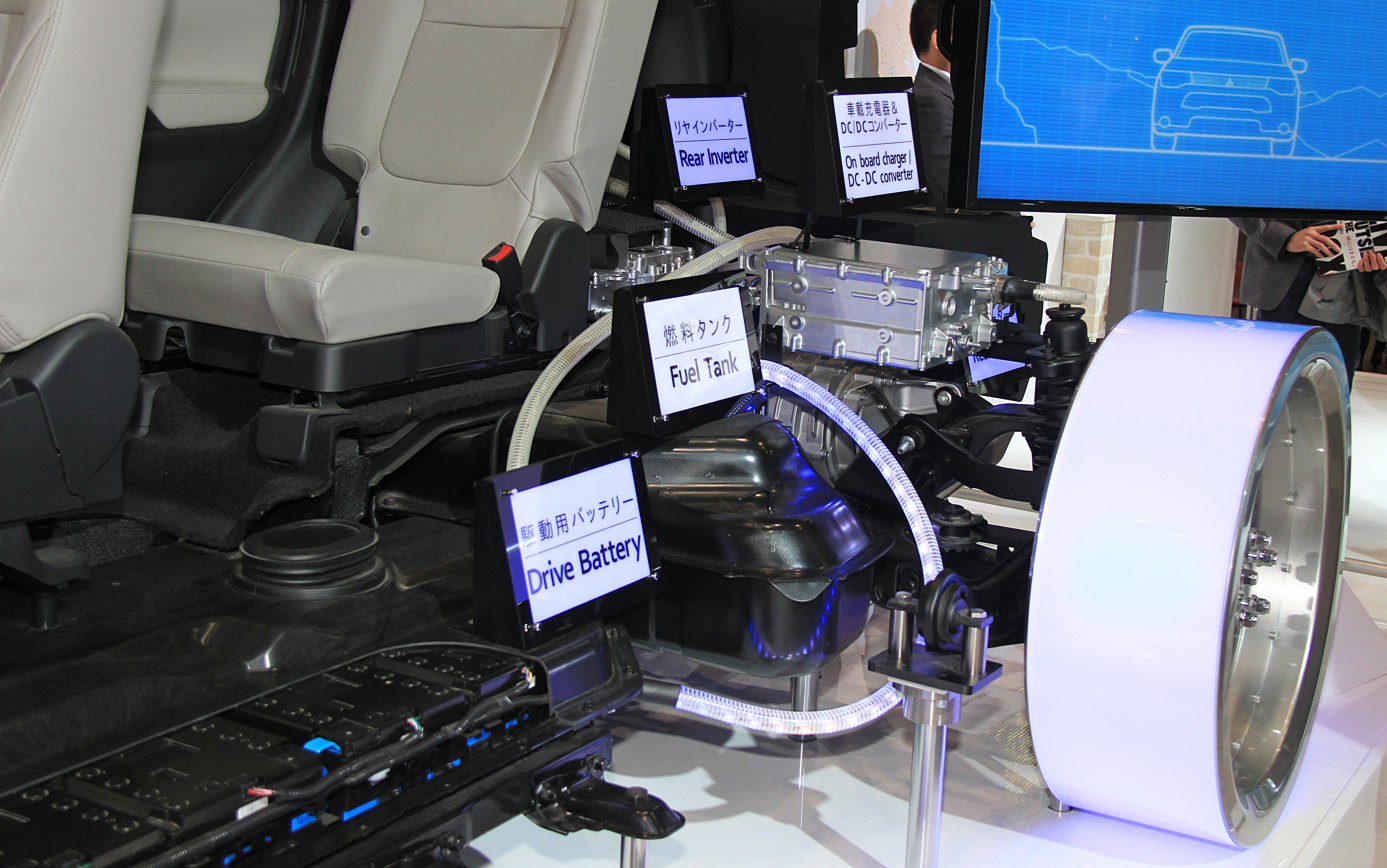
Cutaway showing the location of the 12 kWh lithium-ion battery pack under the seats and fuel tank in the rear.

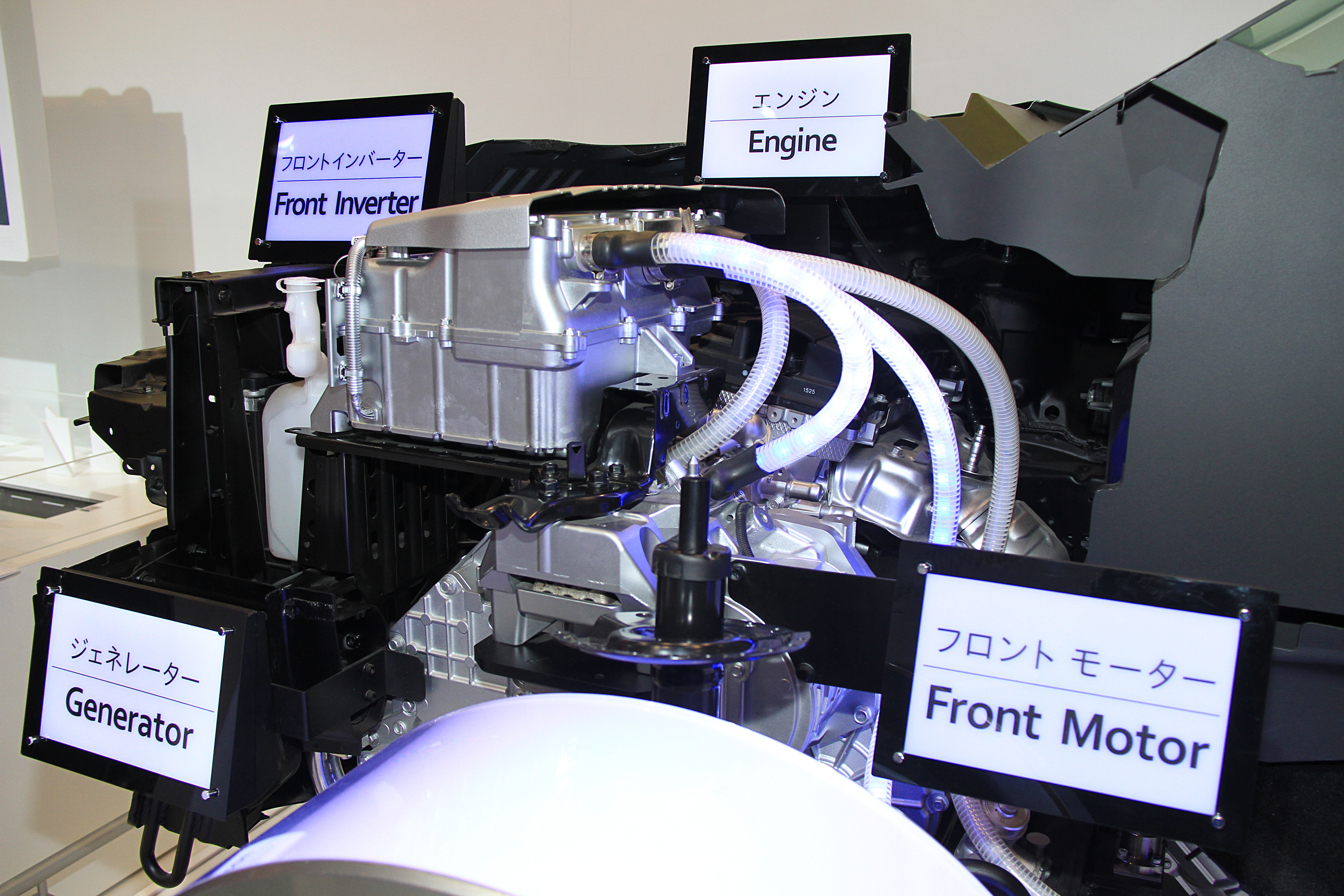
Cutaway showing the location of petrol-powered engine, generator, and front electric motor

The plug-in hybrid has a 2.0-litre 4-cylinder MIVEC petrol engine, coupled with an electric powertrain, derived from the electric systems used on the Mitsubishi i-MiEV, it produces a combined 197 hp (147 kW). Two 60 kW electric motors independently power the front and rear wheels, while the petrol-powered engine can be used as a generator for the motors, and/or power the vehicle directly. The combustion engine can only send power to the front wheels as there is no driveshaft linking it to the rear wheels. Located on the left side of the engine (positioned transaxle-style), the front motor is a smaller, lighter, and higher output version of the permanent magnet synchronous electric motor used in the i-MiEV.

The Outlander PHEV has a 12 kWh lithium-ion battery pack capable of delivering an all-electric range of 52.3 km (32.5 mi) under the New European Driving Cycle. Under the Japanese JC08 test the all-electric range is 60 km (37 mi), with a top speed of 120 km/h (75 mph). The battery pack is located in a dust- and waterproof encasement positioned beneath the passenger compartment subfloor and between the front and rear axles, with no intrusion into the passenger compartment. It consists of 80 cells configured in series. Mitsubishi's target was to achieve a combined fuel economy for Japan in "EV Drive" mode of 67 km/L equivalent, or equivalent to about 157 miles per U.S. gallon (MPGe). Fuel economy in hybrid mode for Japan is 5.3 L/100 km (44 mpg_{‑US}).

The plug-in hybrid comes equipped with two charging sockets, regular and quick charging CHAdeMO. When charging at home the driver can choose between a standard 3-pin plug socket or via a dedicated EV charging point. From a standard plug, charging from empty to full charge takes about five hours. From a dedicated charging point at home or at a public charging point, it takes about 3.5 hours for a full charge. The DC rapid charging socket can be used at CHAdeMO charging stations. Rapid charging allows for an 80% charge in approximately 25 minutes.

The Outlander PHEV features three driver-activated modes, which are ECO Mode, Battery Save Mode and Battery Charge Mode, along with three driving modes: "EV Drive", "Series Hybrid", and "Parallel Hybrid". It also features regenerative braking during normal deceleration (braking or coasting), with the front and rear electric motors working as generators so that electricity can be generated and fed back into the main battery pack. In addition, the plug-in hybrid has a set-up that allows the driver to control the strength of the engine braking with paddles behind the steering wheel. The driver switches on regenerative braking either by sliding the central selector to the "B" position, or by operating the paddles.

The 2019 model Outlander has a 13.8 kWh battery, which increases the range to 65 km (40 mi) and the top speed to 135 km/h (84 mph).

==== Sales ====
Sales began in Japan by late January 2013, becoming the first SUV plug-in hybrid in the market.

The European version was unveiled at the 2013 Geneva Motor Show. The European version is similar to the Japanese model except for minor adjustments to comply with EU requirements, and Mitsubishi expected an emission rating of 44 g/km. Retail deliveries began in Europe in October 2013, beginning in the Netherlands and followed by the Nordic countries, Sales in Australia were originally scheduled for June 2013, but began only in 2014.

The introduction in the United States was initially scheduled for January 2014, but was delayed. Due to California's regulations that require a battery-monitoring unit (BMU), Mitsubishi delayed the market launch in the U.S. to mid-2017 as model year 2017. The BMU conducts onboard diagnosis of the Outlander's lithium-ion battery capacity and output, and it alerts the driver to possible degradation, which might affect the vehicle's emissions.

The Outlander PHEV ranked as the world's top selling plug-in hybrid in 2014, and also as the third best-selling plug-in electric car after the all-electrics Tesla Model S and Nissan Leaf. Global sales totaled about 42,400 units in 2015, representing 24.6% of worldwide sales of the Outlander lineup, making the plug-in hybrid for a second year in a row the world's best-selling plug-in hybrid, and also the third top selling plug-in electric car.

The Outlander PHEV ranked in 2014 as the top selling plug-in electric vehicle in Europe. During 2015, the Outlander plug-in hybrid surpassed the Leaf as the all-time top selling plug-in passenger car in Europe. In 2017, the Outlander PHEV topped plug-in hybrid sales in Europe, for the fifth year running.

European sales passed the 100,000 unit milestone in January 2018, and global deliveries achieved the 150,000 unit mark in March 2018. The 200,000th unit milestone was attained in March 2019. Global sales reached 250,000 units in May 2020, and 300,000 units in January 2022. As of October 2024, cumulative global sales of the Outlander PHEV exceeded 370,000 units across its two generations. According to JATO Dynamics, the Outlander PHEV became the world's all-time best selling plug-in hybrid in December 2018. As of March 2019, the Outlander plug-in hybrid was available for retail sales in 50 countries.

The following table presents retail sales and registrations for the top selling national markets by year through December 2015.

Mitsubishi Outlander PHEV sales/registrations by country 2013–2015
Country	Cumulative 2013–2015	2015	2014	2013
Japan	30,668	10,996	10,064	9,608
Netherlands	24,506	8,781	7,686	8,039
UK	17,045	11,681	5,364	
Sweden	5,687	3,302	2,289	96
Norway	4,360	2,875	1,485	
Germany	3,188	2,128	1,060	
France	1,727	907	820	
Australia	1,483	588^{(1)}	895	
Switzerland	730	290	440	
Spain	598	389	209	
Belgium	352	191	160	1
New Zealand	336	139	197	
Portugal	261	229	32	
Finland	248	102	146	
Italy	209	142	67	
Europe	59,264	31,214	19,853	8,197
Global sales	91,341	42,400	31,136	17,805
Notes: (1) Sales in Australia through September 2015.

==== Reception ====
The Outlander PHEV was selected as one of the top five finalists for the 2014 World Green Car of the Year.

==== Battery incident ====
In March 2013, the battery pack of an Outlander PHEV at a dealership in Yokohama overheated and melted some of the battery cells, after the vehicle had been fully charged and stood for one day. Nobody was injured in the incident. The battery packs are produced by GS Yuasa, the same company that supplies the batteries for the Boeing 787 Dreamliner, whose entire fleet was grounded in January 2013 for battery problems. Mitsubishi did not issue a recall but halted production and sales until it determined the cause of the battery problems. The carmaker advised the 4,000 owners of the Outlander plug-in hybrid to drive only on gasoline mode for the time being. On 19 August 2013, after changing a production process to avoid damaging any batteries, Mitsubishi restarted production of the Outlander plug-in hybrid.

=== Safety ===
==== IIHS ====
The 2014 Outlander was awarded "Top Safety Pick+" by IIHS.

IIHS scores:
Small overlap front (driver)	Good
Small overlap front (passenger)	Good
Moderate overlap front (original test)	Good
Side (original test)	Good
Roof strength	Good
Head restraints and seats	Good
Front crash prevention (vehicle-to-vehicle)	Advanced

==== Euro NCAP ====
Euro NCAP test results* Mitsubishi Outlander diesel 'Intense' (2012)
Test	Points	%
Overall:	5 /5 stars	
Adult occupant:	34	94%
Child occupant:	41	83%
Pedestrian:	23	64%
Safety assist:	7	100%

==== ANCAP ====
ANCAP test results* Mitsubishi Outlander all variants (2012)
Test	Score
Overall	5 /5 stars
Frontal offset	15.58/16
Side impact	16/16
Pole	2/2
Seat belt reminders	2/3
Whiplash protection	Good
Pedestrian protection	Adequate
Electronic stability control	Standard

ANCAP test results* Mitsubishi Outlander all ZL variants (2014)
Test	Score
Overall	5 /5 stars
Frontal offset	15.58/16
Side impact	16/16
Pole	2/2
Seat belt reminders	2/3
Whiplash protection	Good
Pedestrian protection	Adequate
Electronic stability control	Standard

==== ASEAN NCAP ====
ASEAN NCAP test results Mitshubishi Outlander PHEV (2019)
Test	Points
Overall:	5 /5 stars
Adult occupant:	45.45
Child occupant:	21.33
Safety assist:	19.97

ASEAN NCAP test results Mitshubishi Outlander (2020)
Test	Points
Overall:	5 /5 stars
Adult occupant:	45.92
Child occupant:	20.65
Safety assist:	16.96

== Fourth generation (GM/GN/ZM; 2021) ==
Fourth generation
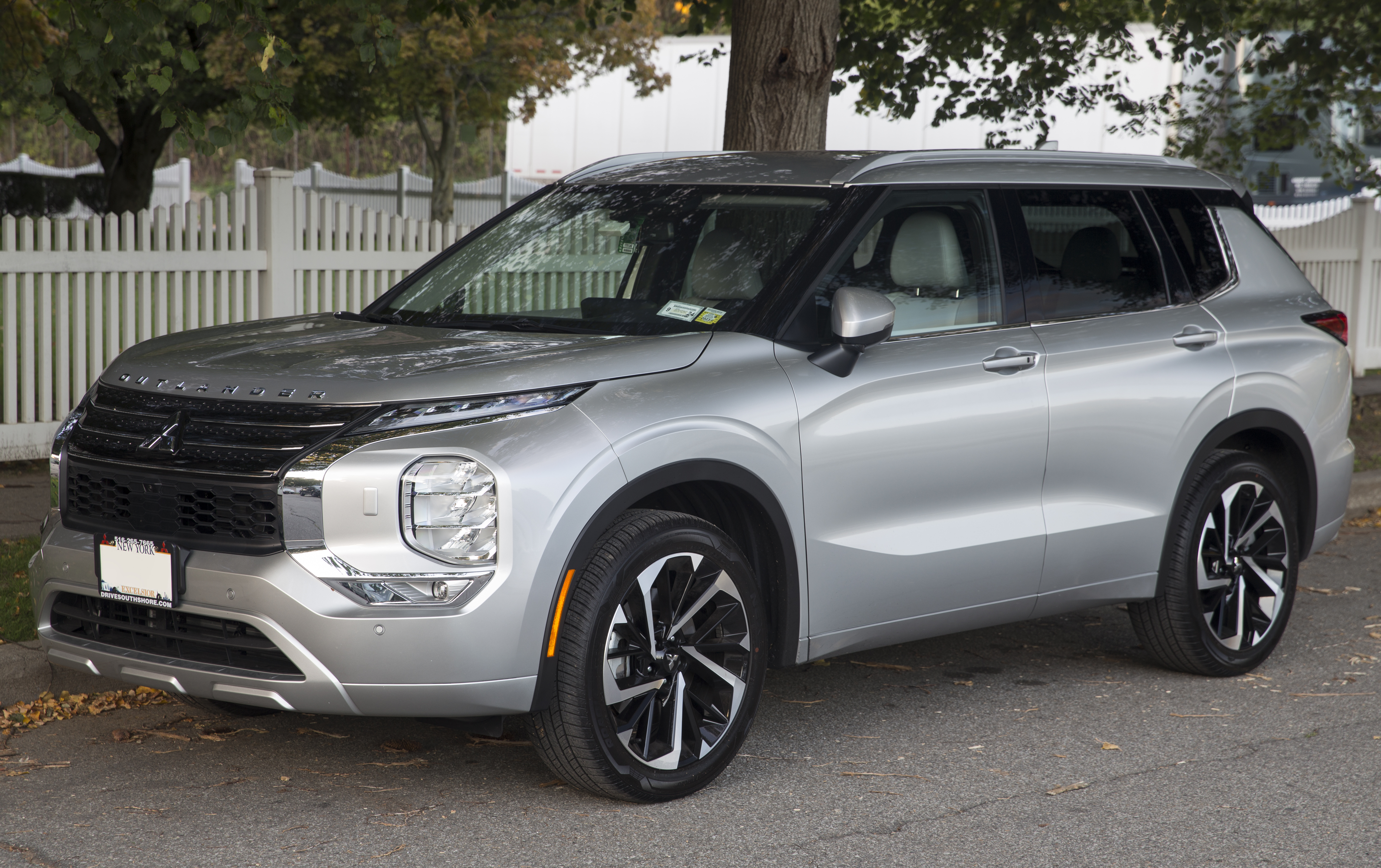
- 2022 Mitsubishi Outlander SEL 2.5 (US)

Overview
- Model code: GM; GN; ZM
- Also called: Nissan Rogue Plug-in Hybrid (North America)
- Production: 2021–present 2026 (Rogue Plug-in Hybrid)
- Model years: 2022–present 2026 (Rogue Plug-in Hybrid)
- Assembly: Japan: Okazaki, Aichi (Okazaki Plant); China: Changsha (GMMC: until 2023)
- Designer: Ryosuke Matsuoka, Shuichiro Yamamoto and Kenichi Noda

Body and chassis
- Platform: Renault–Nissan CMF-CD platform
- Related: Nissan Rogue/X-Trail (T33)

Powertrain
- Engine: Petrol: 1.5 L 4B40 turbo I4 (mild hybrid); 2.5 L Nissan PR25DD I4 (GM4W); Petrol PHEV: 2.4 L 4B12 I4 (GN0W)
- Electric motor: 1×85 kW (114 hp; 116 PS) S91 AC permanent magnet synchronous (front, PHEV); 1×100 kW (134 hp; 136 PS) YA1 AC permanent magnet synchronous (rear, PHEV)
- Power output: 120–130 kW (161–174 hp; 163–177 PS) (4B40); 140 kW (188 hp; 190 PS) (PR25DD); 125 kW (168 hp; 170 PS) (4B12, petrol engine only)
- Transmission: Jatco CVT8 INVECS-III CVT
- Hybrid drivetrain: Mild hybrid (China (2022–2023), North America (2026–present)); Plug-in hybrid (PHEV)
- Battery: 20 (~18 usable) kWh lithium-ion (PHEV)
- Range: 84 km WLTP/NEDC (PHEV)
- Plug-in charging: 3.7 kW AC (PHEV); 22 kW DC (PHEV); V2H: ~10 kW (PHEV); V2L: 1.5 kW

Dimensions
- Wheelbase: 2,705 mm (106.5 in)
- Length: 4,709–4,720 mm (185.4–185.8 in)
- Width: 1,862 mm (73.3 in)
- Height: 1,740–1,748 mm (68.5–68.8 in)
- Curb weight: 2,010–2,110 kg (4,430–4,650 lb) (PHEV)

The fourth-generation Outlander debuted on February 16, 2021, two-thirds of a year after its Nissan Rogue counterpart was launched in North America in June 2020. It first takes inspiration from the GT-PHEV concept which debuted at the 2016 Paris Motor Show, then the Engelberg Tourer concept which debuted at the 2019 Geneva Motor Show, and finally developed four years after Nissan purchased a 34 percent stake in Mitsubishi Motors. It is based on the Nissan Rogue/X-Trail (T33), and is the first Mitsubishi product riding on the new CMF-CD platform. Like its predecessor, it continues to offer the same seven-seat configuration.

Changes include the new PR25DD 2.5-litre petrol engine shared with the Nissan Rogue, producing 181 hp (184 PS; 135 kW) and 245 N⋅m (25.0 kg⋅m; 181 lb⋅ft). A plug-in hybrid powertrain is available with diesel powertrains discontinued. Due to its close ties with the Rogue, many interior elements are also shared with this model. New interior features include an available 9.0-inch infotainment system with wireless Apple CarPlay, a 12.3-inch digital instrument cluster and a head-up display.

In the US, it was sold in five trim levels in 2022: ES, SE, SE Launch Edition, SEL and SEL Launch Edition. In 2023, it was sold in ES, SE Special Edition, SE, Black Edition, SEL, SEL Black Edition, RALLIART, and SEL 40th Anniversary Edition. For 2024, SEL 40th Anniversary Edition was replaced by Platinum Edition. For 2026, the 2.5-litre PR25DD engine was dropped and replaced by the 1.5-litre 4B40 turbocharged engine with 48 V mild hybrid system. Trim levels include ES, LE, SE, SEL, and Trail Edition.

The model was introduced in Australia in November 2021 and went on sale in February 2022. Trim levels available are ES, LS, Aspire, Exceed and Exceed Tourer, with the ES trim receiving both 5-seat and 7-seat options.

The Outlander includes a 360-degree camera, forward collision mitigation, lane-departure warning, blind-spot monitoring. The North American market 2022 Outlander SE Launch Edition adds features such as adaptive cruise control and lane departure prevention.

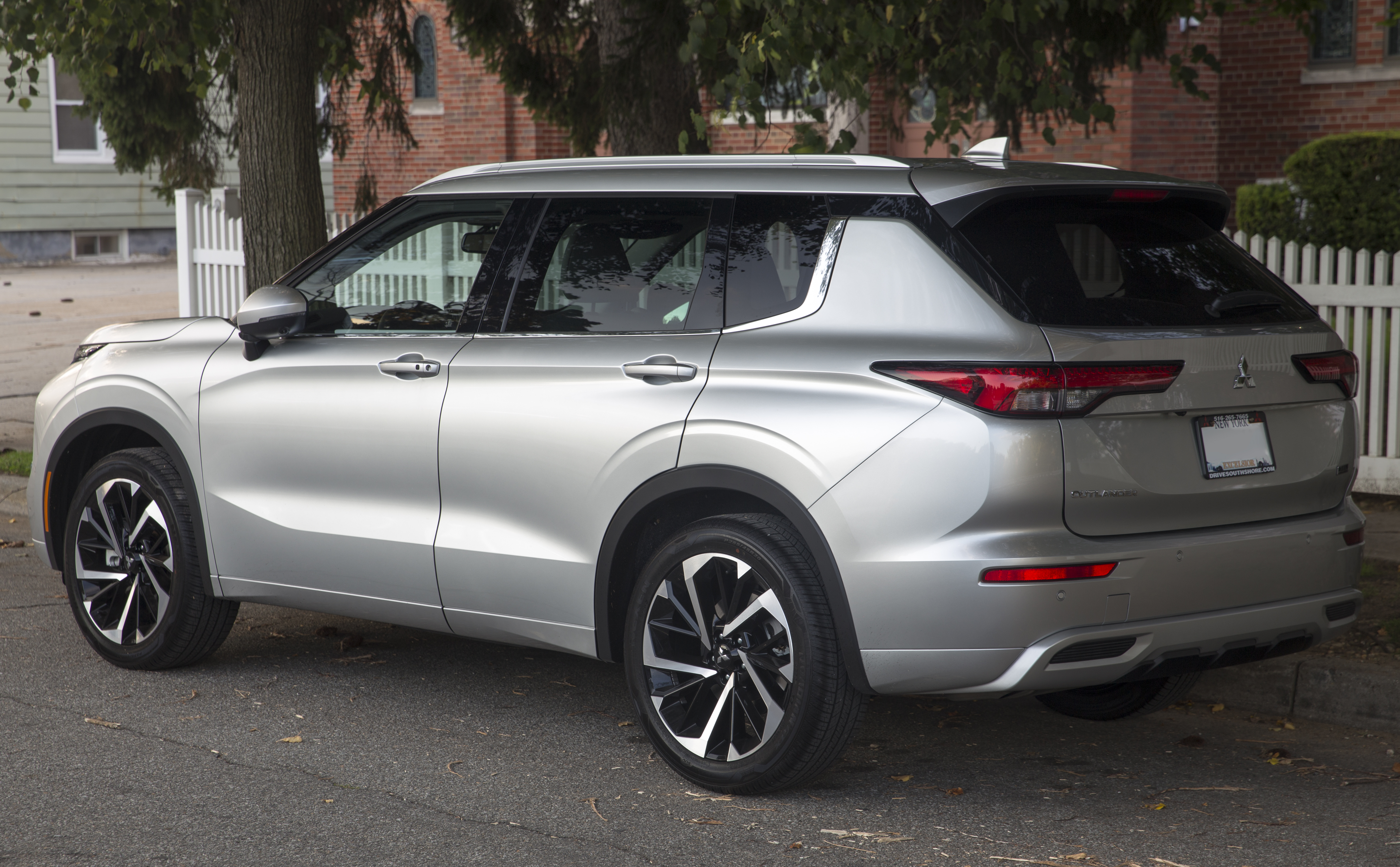
Rear

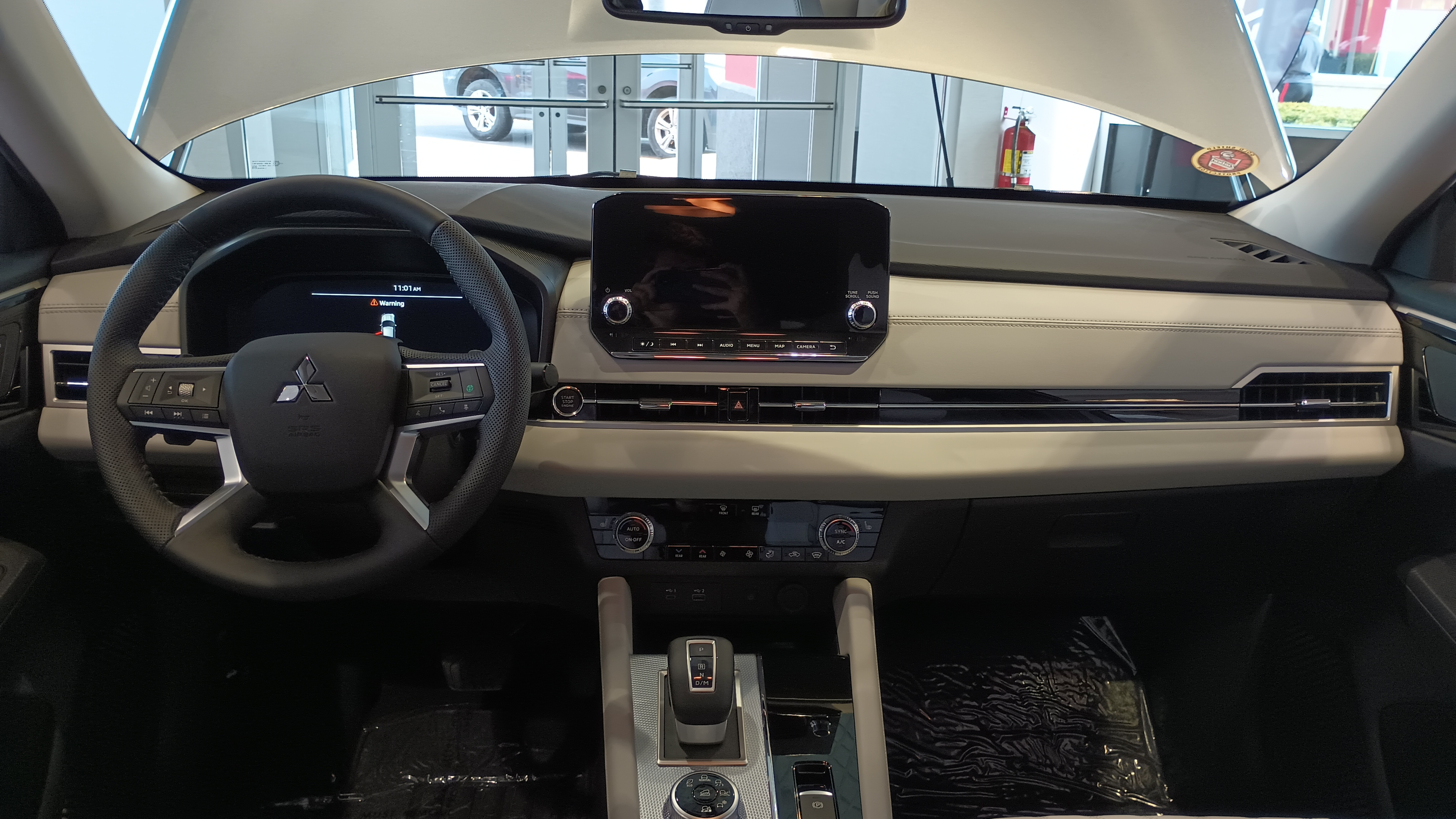
Interior

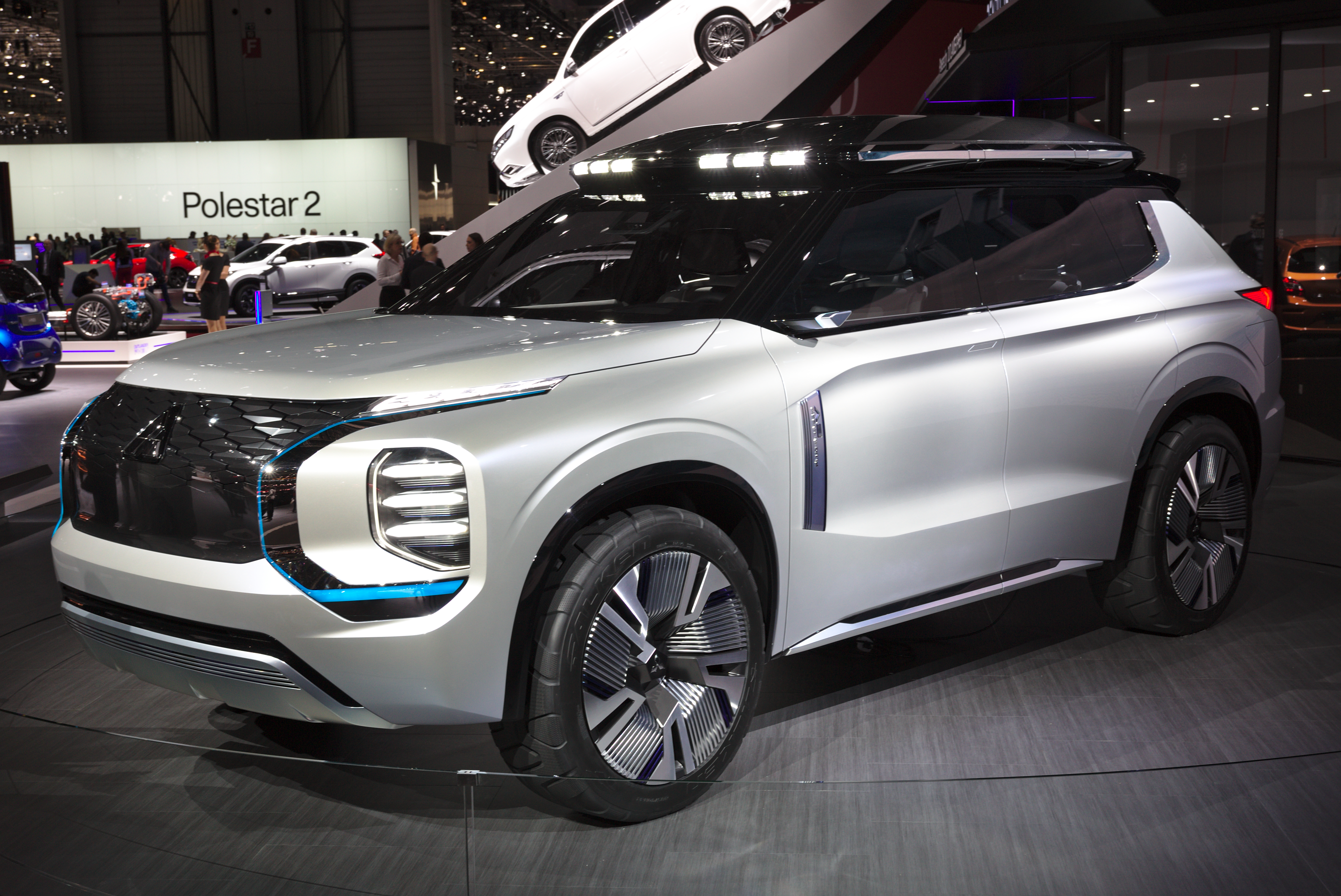
2019 Mitsubishi Engelberg Tourer Concept, which previewed the fourth-generation Outlander

=== Outlander PHEV ===
The plug-in hybrid version was released in Japan in October 2021. It retains the 4B12 engine used by the previous generation Outlander PHEV, coupled with a more powerful motor and a larger 20 kWh battery. The revised setup means an increased power output on the front and rear motors, combining for a total driving range of 87 km (54.1 mi) in electric-only mode. The engine was rated at 170 PS (125 kW; 168 hp) at 6,000 rpm and 226–232 N⋅m (167–171 lb⋅ft) at 4,100 rpm depending on region. Contrary to its predecessor, the PHEV model is available in a 7-seat configuration which made possible by unifying the rear motor with the control unit.

The second generation Outlander PHEV went on sale in North America in 2022 for the 2023 model year. The model became available in some European countries beginning in early 2025.

Starting in early 2026 for the 2026 model year, the Outlander has been supplied to Nissan as the Nissan Rogue Plug-in Hybrid in the North American market. Based on the 2025 model year Outlander PHEV, the Nissan-badged model came with light visual changes including a modified grille and rear tail lights. The Rogue Plug-in Hybrid is planned to be discontinued for the 2027 model year as it was only intended to be a temporary gap-filler before the launch a new Nissan Rogue with a e-Power series-hybrid drivetrain in North America.

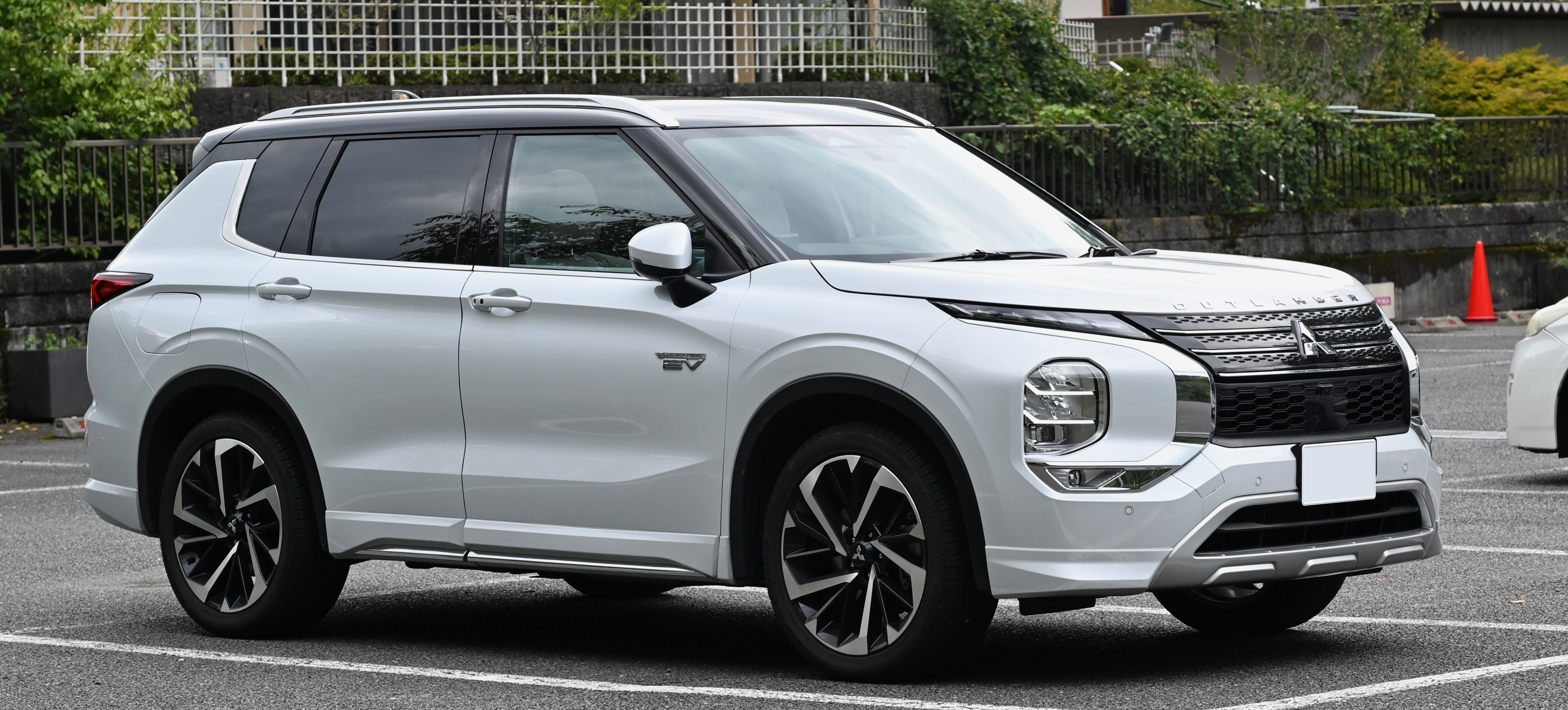
Mitsubishi Outlander PHEV (pre-facelift)

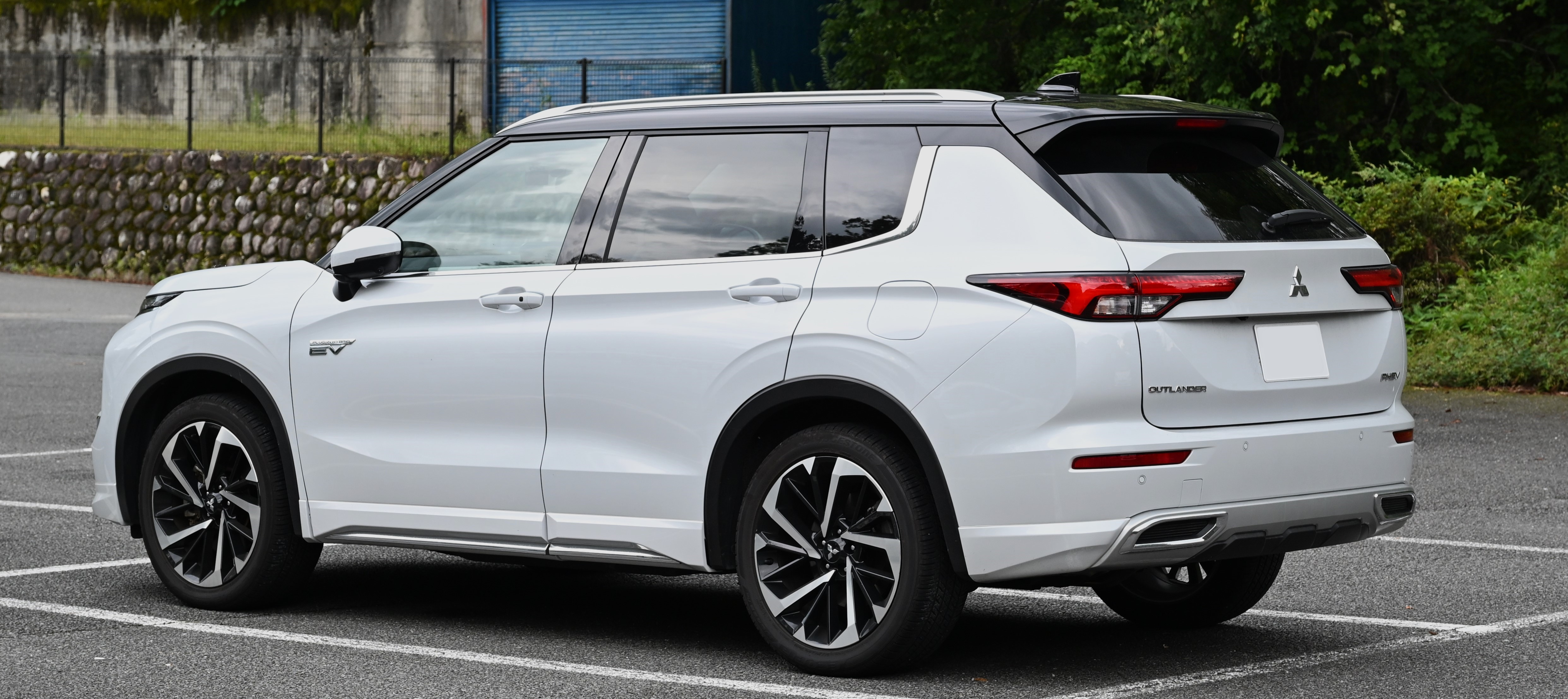
Rear (PHEV)

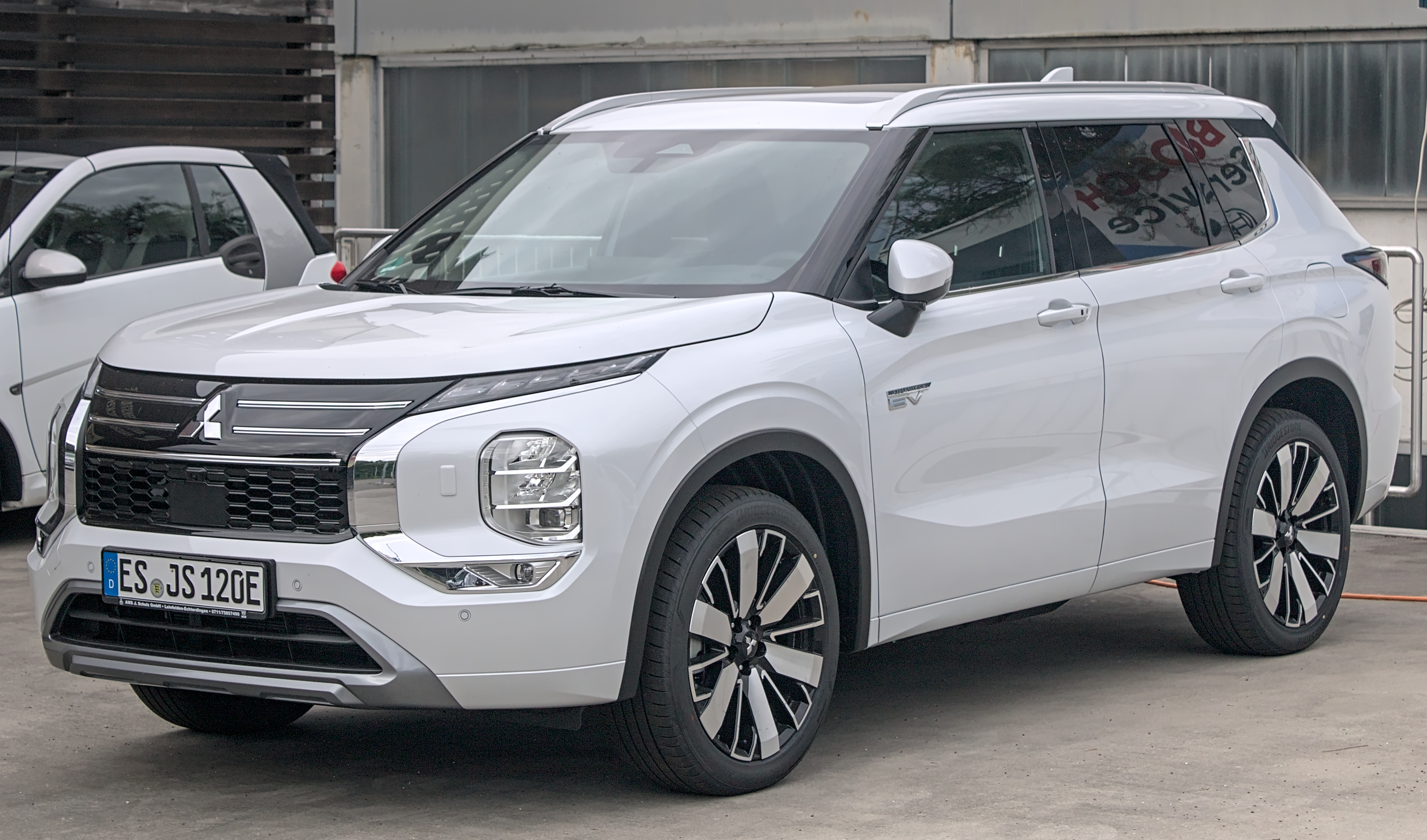
2024 refresh

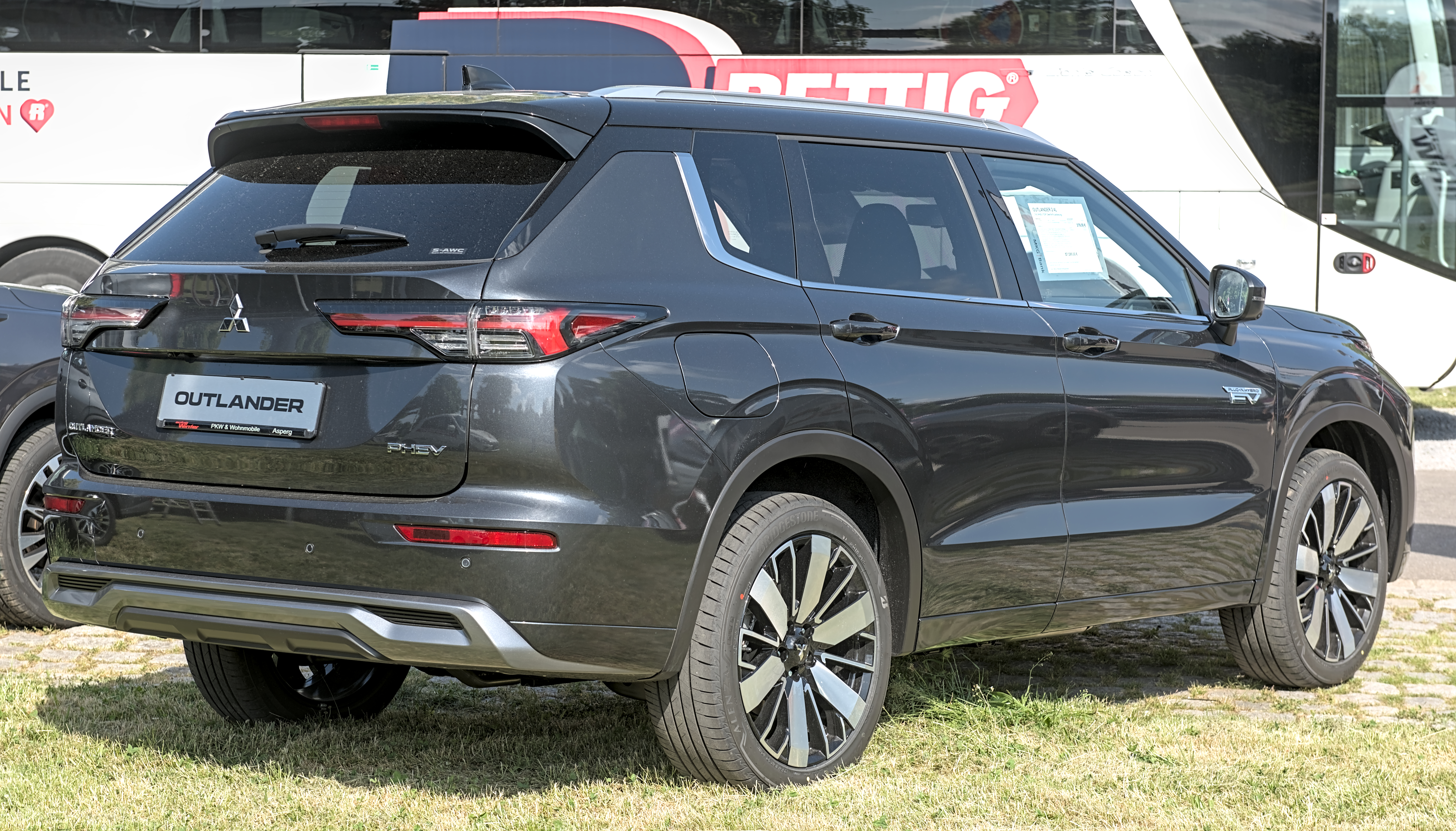
2024 refresh

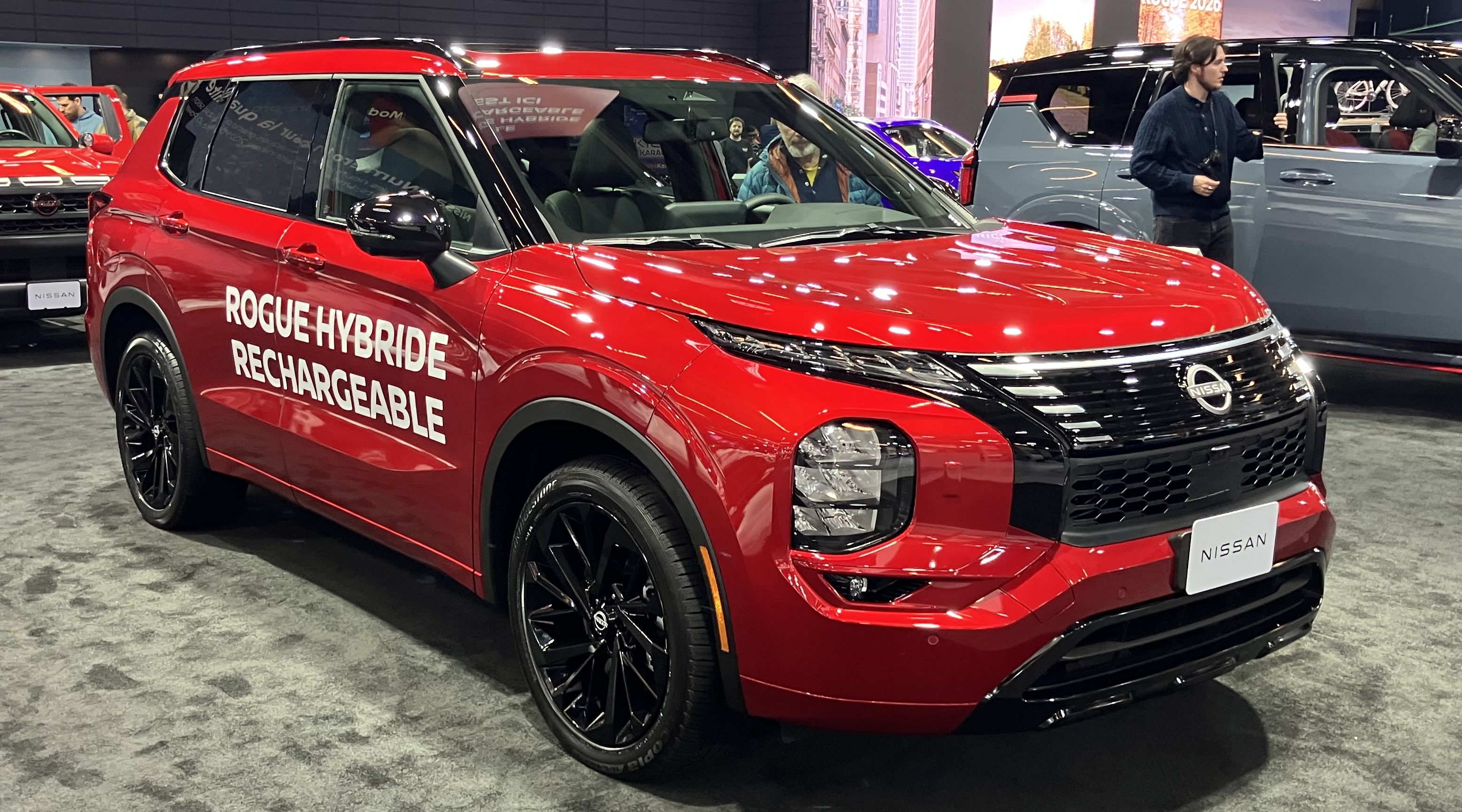
2026 Nissan Rogue Plug-in Hybrid

Nissan Rogue Plug-in Hybrid (Rear)

=== Powertrain ===
Engines
Spec Type	Model	Engine code	Displacement	Power	Torque	Combined system output	Electric motor	Battery	Transmission	Top speed	0–100 km/h (0–62 mph)	Layout	Cal. years
Petrol	2.5	PR25DD	2,488 cc (2.5 L) I4	181 hp (135 kW; 184 PS) at 6,000	245 N⋅m (181 lb⋅ft) at 3,600	-	-	-	CVT	208 km/h (129 mph)	9.9 s	FWD AWD	February 2021 – present
Petrol plug-in hybrid	2.4 MIVEC	4B12	2,360 cc (2.4 L) I4	Engine: 133 hp (99 kW; 135 PS) at 5,000 rpm Front motor: 116 hp (87 kW; 118 PS) Rear motor: 136 hp (101 kW; 138 PS)	Engine: 195 N⋅m (144 lb⋅ft) at 4,300 rpm Front motor: 255 N⋅m (188 lb⋅ft) Rear motor: 195 N⋅m (144 lb⋅ft)	Power: 252 hp (188 kW; 255 PS) Torque: 450 N⋅m (332 lb⋅ft)	2x AC PMSM Front motor: S91 Rear motor: YA1	350 V, 20 kW⋅h lithium-ion	GKN Multinode Fixed Single Gear Hybrid Transmission with Parallel Direct Drive and Series Mode	171 km/h (106 mph)	10.5 s	AWD	October 2021 – present
Petrol mild hybrid	1.5	4B40	1,499 cc (1.5 L) turbo I4	161–174 hp (120–130 kW; 163–176 PS) at 5,000 rpm	280 N⋅m (207 lb⋅ft) at 3,500 rpm	-	48 V mild hybrid system	-	CVT	N/A	N/A	FWD AWD	November 2022 – present

=== Awards ===
Mitsubishi Outlander PHEV won the Technology Car of the Year Award in 2021–2022 Japan Car of the Year Awards.

=== Safety ===
==== Latin NCAP ====
The Outlander in its most basic Latin American configuration received 5 stars from Latin NCAP 3.0 in 2023 (similar to Euro NCAP 2014).

Latin NCAP 3.0 test results Mitsubishi Outlander + 7 Airbags (2022, similar to Euro NCAP 2014)
Test	Points	%
Overall:	5 /5 stars	
Adult occupant:	34.84	87%
Child occupant:	44.75	91%
Pedestrian:	26.26	55%
Safety assist:	36.19	84%

==== IIHS ====
The 2022 Outlander was awarded "Top Safety Pick+" by IIHS.

IIHS scores
Small overlap front (driver)	Good	
Small overlap front (passenger)	Good	
Moderate overlap front (original test)	Good	
Side (original test)	Good	
Roof strength	Good	
Head restraints and seats	Good	
Headlights (varies by trim/option)	Good	Poor
Front crash prevention: vehicle-to-vehicle	Superior	
Front crash prevention: vehicle-to-pedestrian (Day)	Superior	
Child seat anchors (LATCH) ease of use	Good	

==== ANCAP ====
The Outlander received 5 stars from ANCAP in 2022:

ANCAP test results Mitsubishi Outlander all ZM variants (2022, aligned with Euro NCAP)
Test	Points	%
Overall:	5 /5 stars	
Adult occupant:	31.61	83%
Child occupant:	45.43	92%
Pedestrian:	44.20	81%
Safety assist:	13.35	83%

ANCAP test results Mitsubishi Outlander all variants (2025, aligned with Euro NCAP)
Test	Points	%
Overall:	5 /5 stars	
Adult occupant:	34.38	85%
Child occupant:	41.24	84%
Pedestrian:	50.36	79%
Safety assist:	12.64	70%

== Sales and production ==
Global Outlander sales achieved the 1.5 million unit milestone in October 2016, 15 years after its market launch.

=== Sales ===
Year	Japan (Note: Data from 2013 onwards includes both the regular and PHEV Outlander versions.)	U.S.	Canada	Europe	Australia	China	Malaysia (Note: Figures based on registration (Malaysia))	Indonesia
2002		11,346						—N/a
2003		34,088		8,001				—N/a
2004		18,104		11,468		14,918		—N/a
2005	8,461	11,848	2,728	9,575		8,800	22	—N/a
2006	22,336	11,493	2,841	7,921		6,538	74	—N/a
2007	12,702	23,285	6,227	34,026		5,146	118	—N/a
2008	8,026	13,471	6,507	28,941			0	—N/a
2009	6,615	10,283	8,530	19,242			3	—N/a
2010	8,162	12,500	8,343	21,740			3	—N/a
2011	4,591	9,788	5,711	17,783			3	—N/a
2012	3,912	7,750	5,267	14,711	8,051		4	5,118
2013	12,783	12,287	5,262	25,960			2	4,706
2014	12,038	13,068	5,330	33,744			1	3,888
2015	13,795	19,055	6,108	46,581			1	2,290
2016	8,155	26,576	6,324	40,578		16,655	701	1,812
2017	7,591	35,409 (inc. 99 PHEV)	7,420	36,281	16,632	84,708	811	930
2018	16,146	41,818 (inc. 4,166 PHEV)	11,038	39,242	15,573	105,621	2,714	816
2019	7,037	40,775 (inc. 2,810 PHEV)	10,701	47,381	17,514	84,960	2,193	186 (inc. 20 PHEV)
2020	3,600	29,096 (inc. 1,964 PHEV)	7,315	33,729	12,004	57,096	947	40 (inc. 6 PHEV)
2021	2,474	36,133 (inc. 2,250 PHEV)	9,509	13,897	14,572	55,856	824	35 (Note: The sales of the locally assembled Outlander Sport officially ended in early 2021 after its production ceased in late 2020. However, the premium imported Outlander PHEV variant remained available in the Indonesian market until it was officially discontinued in February 2024 due to depleted inventory and shifts in global production.)
2022	17,662	42,903 (inc. 1,961 PHEV)	9,880	283	19,546	35,323	6	10
2023	13,395	49,182 (inc. 6,681 PHEV)	19,551		24,263	8,895		3
2024	8,126	52,228 (inc. 6,975 PHEV)	23,295 (inc. 14,290 PHEV)		27,613			1 (Note: The imported Outlander PHEV (Plug-in Hybrid Electric Vehicle) was officially discontinued in Indonesia in February 2024 after PT Mitsubishi Motors Krama Yudha Sales Indonesia (MMKSI) sold all remaining stock due to changes in global production.)
2025		42,189 (inc. 6,294 PHEV)	21,587 (inc. 8,899 PHEV)					—N/a

=== Production ===
Year	Production		Sales				Total (Year)	
Year	Airtrek	Outlander	Airtrek (Japan)	Airtrek (export)	Outlander (Japan)	Outlander (export)	Produced	Sold
2001	21,245	-	19,160	601	-	-	21,245	19,761
2002	68,431	-	14,132	45,845	-	-	68,431	59,977
2003	77,331	60,512+	7,427	7,917	N/A	60,512	137,843+	75,856+
2004	60,817	56,997+	3,198	320	N/A	56,997	117,814+	60,515+
2005	49,596	21,173	1,030	302	18,919	48,822	70,769	69,073
2006	31,326	81,883	10	248	16,734	91,693	113,209	108,685
2007	10,857+	170,084	N/A	N/A	11,194	157,292	180,941+	168,486+
2008	5,714+	129,383	N/A	N/A	6,531	115,849	135,097+	122,380+
2009	-	98,718	-	-	7,638	89,919	98,718	97,557
2010	-	124,345	-	-	6,852	116,672	124,345	123,524
2011	-	96,261	-	-	4,249	93,828	96,261	98,077
2012	-	105,995	-	-	8,439	95,305	105,995	103,744
2013	-	N/A	-	-	9,608+	8,197+	N/A	17,805+
2014	-	N/A	-	-	10,064+	21,072+	N/A	31,136+
2015	-	N/A	-	-	N/A	N/A	N/A	172,100
2016								185,000
2017								257,000
2018								235,000
Total (separate)	264,500+	1,000,599+	44,957+	55,233+	93,376+	956,158+	1,382,608+	1,149,724+
Total (Combined)	1,382,608+		1,149,724+				232,884+ (not sold)	

(sources: Facts and Figures, Mitsubishi Motors website. Facts & Figures 2005, Facts & Figures 2009, Facts & Figures 2013 Archived 1 December 2020 at the Wayback Machine, Facts & Figures 2019)
