= Mitsubishi Lancer Evolution =

Sports sedan and rally car

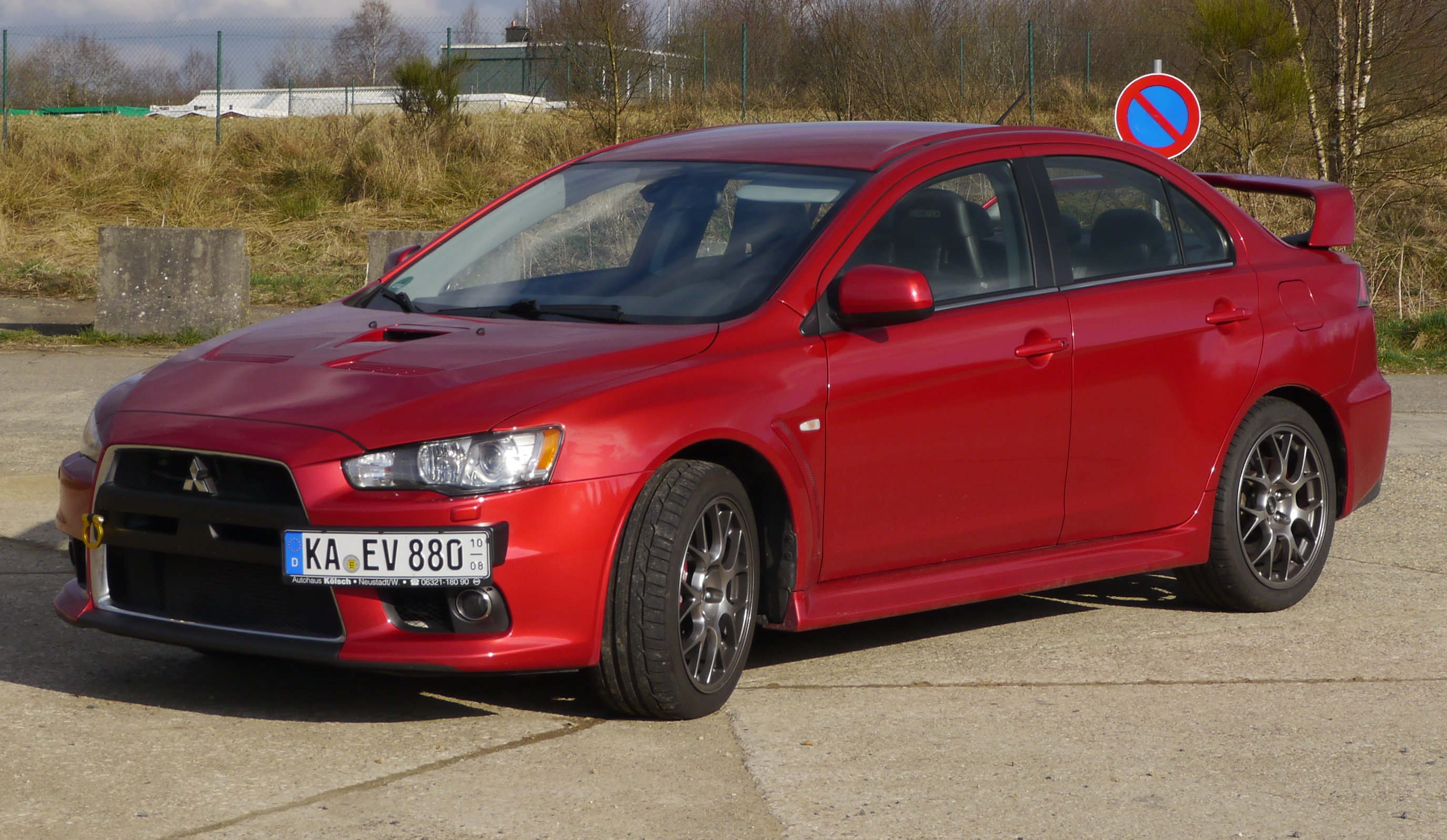
- Mitsubishi Lancer Evolution X

Overview
- Manufacturer: Mitsubishi Motors
- Production: 1992–2016
- Assembly: Japan: Okazaki, Aichi (Nagoya Plant: first to ninth generations); Kurashiki, Okayama (Mizushima Plant: tenth generation)

Body and chassis
- Class: Sport compact car
- Body style: 4-door sedan; 5-door station wagon (2006–2007)
- Layout: Front-engine, four-wheel-drive (S-AWC)
- Related: Mitsubishi Lancer; Mitsubishi Lancer WRC; Mitsubishi Racing Lancer

Powertrain
- Engine: 2.0 L I4 turbo; 4G63T (1992–2007); 4B11T (2008–2016)
- Transmission: 6-speed TC-SST (2007–2015); 5-speed automatic (2002, 2006–2007); 5-speed manual (1992–2016); 6-speed manual (2003–2008)

Chronology
- Predecessor: Mitsubishi Galant VR-4

The Mitsubishi Lancer Evolution, popularly referred to as the "Lancer Evo", "LanEvo" or "Evo", is a sports sedan and rally car based on the Lancer that was manufactured by Japanese manufacturer Mitsubishi Motors from 1992 until 2016. There have been ten official versions to date, and the designation of each model is most commonly a Roman numeral. All generations use two-litre intercooled turbo inline four-cylinder engines and all-wheel drive systems.

The Lancer Evolution was originally intended only for Japanese markets, but demand on the "grey import" market led the Evolution series to be offered through Ralliart dealer networks in the United Kingdom and in various European markets from around 1997 with the Evolution IV. Mitsubishi decided to export the Evolution VIII to the United States in 2003 after witnessing the success Subaru had in that market the previous year with the Subaru Impreza WRX.

All domestic-market versions, until the release of the Evolution IX in 2005, were limited by a gentlemen's agreement between Japanese car manufacturers to advertise no more than 280 PS (206 kW; 276 hp). However, sources say Mitsubishi had already been producing cars with more power but had been underrating the official power outputs in order to comply with the agreement. Therefore, each subsequent version has unofficially evolved above the advertised power figures, with the Japanese-market Evolution IX reaching an alleged output of around 320 PS (235 kW; 316 hp). Various special versions available in other markets, particularly the UK, have official power outputs up to 446 PS (328 kW; 440 hp).

The tenth and final generation of the Lancer Evolution, the Evolution X, was launched in Japan in 2007, and overseas markets in 2008. The Evolution X was produced for 9 years until Mitsubishi retired the Lancer Evolution in April 2016.

In certain markets in Europe, the Evolution IV, V, VI and VII were sold under the "Carisma GT" name. This decision was made because the regular Lancer sedan was not widely sold in that region at the time and also to boost the sales of the unrelated Carisma. Initially, only the RS trim was sold in that region for competition purposes, until the RS2 or GSR specifications for the Evolution VI and VII eventually became available as well.

Some of the Lancer Evolutions were also homologated by FIA for Proton, which bore their emblems for their rally activities. The Evolution II and III were rebadged as the "Proton Wira 4WD Turbo", while the V, VI and VII were renamed the "Proton PERT".

== Evolution I ==
First generation
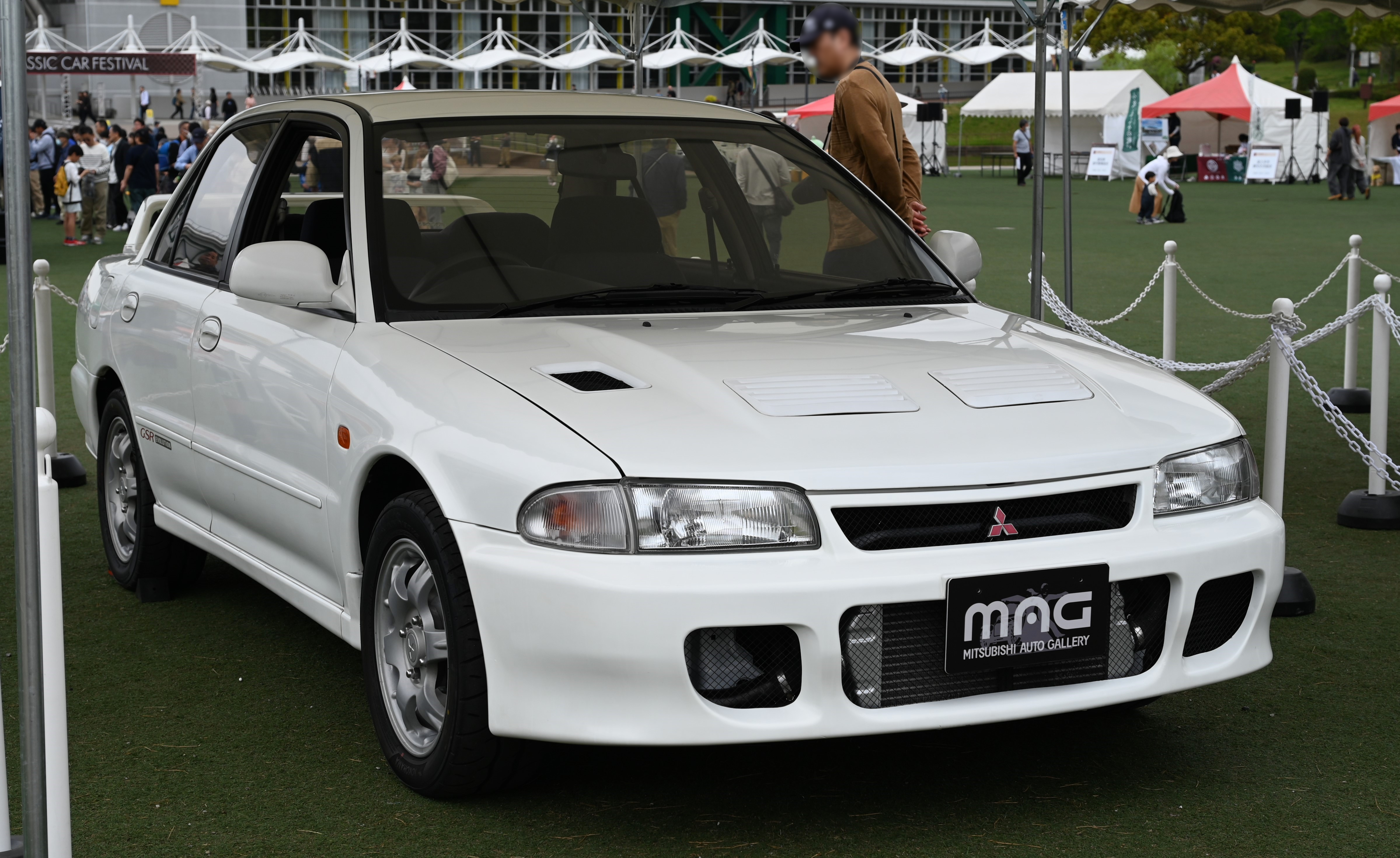
- 1992 Lancer GSR Evolution

Overview
- Production: October 1992 – January 1994

Body and chassis
- Platform: CD9A
- Related: Mitsubishi Lancer sixth generation

Powertrain
- Engine: 2.0 L 4G63T turbo I4
- Transmission: 5-speed manual

Dimensions
- Wheelbase: 2,500 mm (98.4 in)
- Length: 4,310 mm (169.7 in)
- Width: 1,695 mm (66.7 in)
- Height: 1,395 mm (54.9 in)
- Curb weight: 1,170–1,240 kg (2,579–2,734 lb)

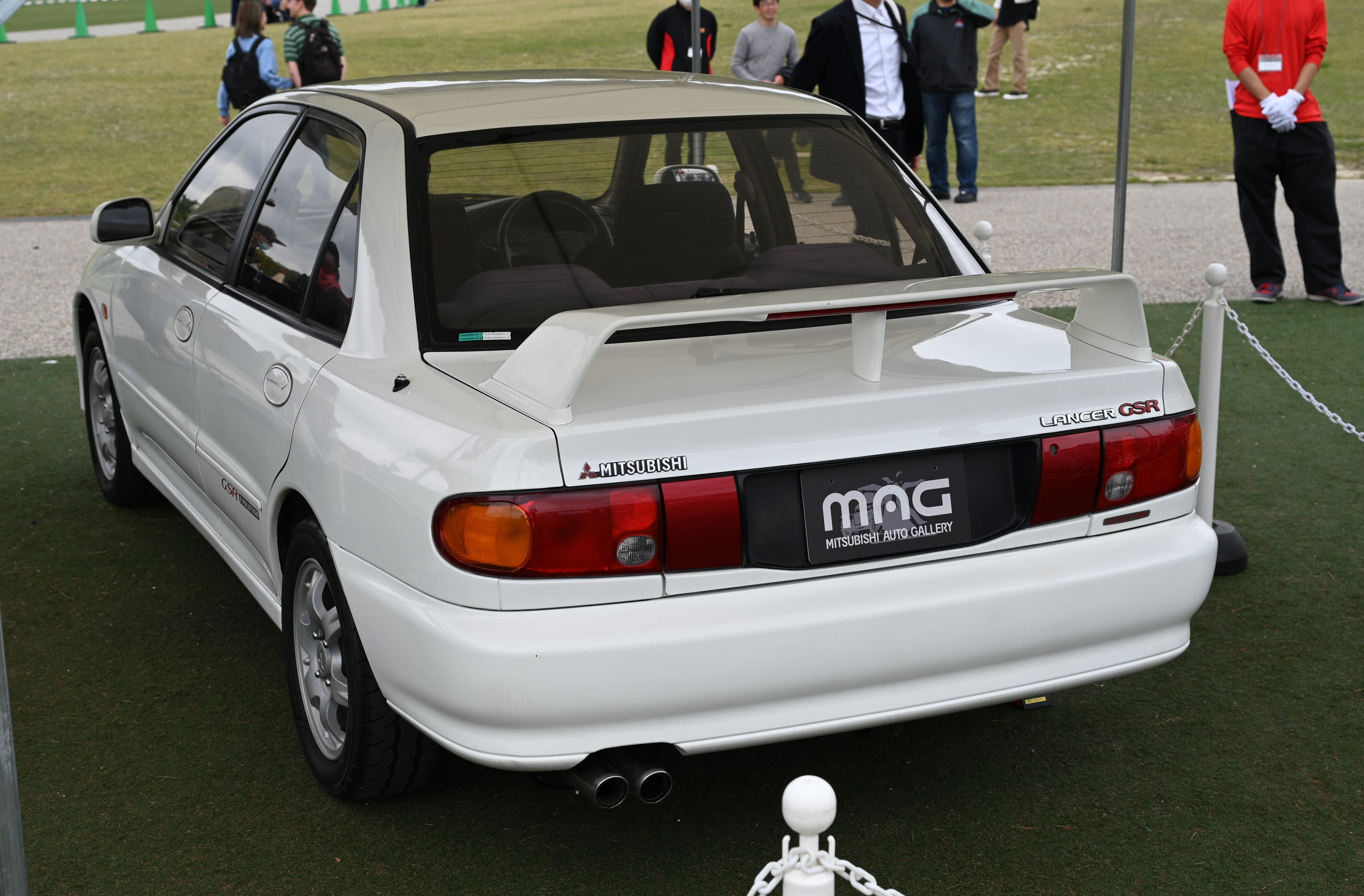
Rear

The first Lancer Evolution used the 2.0 L turbocharged DOHC engine and AWD drivetrain from the original Galant VR-4 in a Lancer chassis, and was sold in both base GSR Evolution and GSR Evolution RS models. This engine was also used in the Mitsubishi RVR with the Hyper Sports Gear trim package, and the Mitsubishi Chariot Resort Runner GT. The RS was a stripped-down version that lacked power windows and seats, anti-lock brakes, a rear wiper, and had steel wheels to weigh approximately 70 kg (154 lb) less than the 1,238 kg (2,729 lb) GSR, ready for racing or tuning. These new “Evolution” badged cars came as an upgrade to the existing Lancer GSR model, which also featured full time 4WD but a milder appearance package and a smaller 1.8 liter 4G93T engine. Mitsubishi continued selling 1.8 turbo 4WD GSR models alongside the faster Evolution models throughout the sixth and seventh generation Lancer’s lifespans, although they are very rare.

As with the previous Galant VR4, a lightweight RS version was available which omitted electric windows, A/C and other luxuries. Mechanically identical to the GSR aside from a mechanical plate type rear limited-slip differential (LSD). The GSR came with all of the conveniences of a typical street car, including a digital screen climate control system. It came with Mitsubishi's 4G63 engine producing 250 PS (184 kW; 247 hp) at 6,000 rpm and 309 N⋅m (228 lb⋅ft) at 3,000 rpm. 5,000 of the first generation Evolutions were sold between 1992 and 1993. Top speed was 228 km/h (142 mph). The GSR version of the Evolution I was the only Evolution Lancer released with a viscous limited-slip rear differential (VLSD). The subsequent Evolution Lancer models all featured rear mechanical plate type LSD's.

== Evolution II ==
Second generation
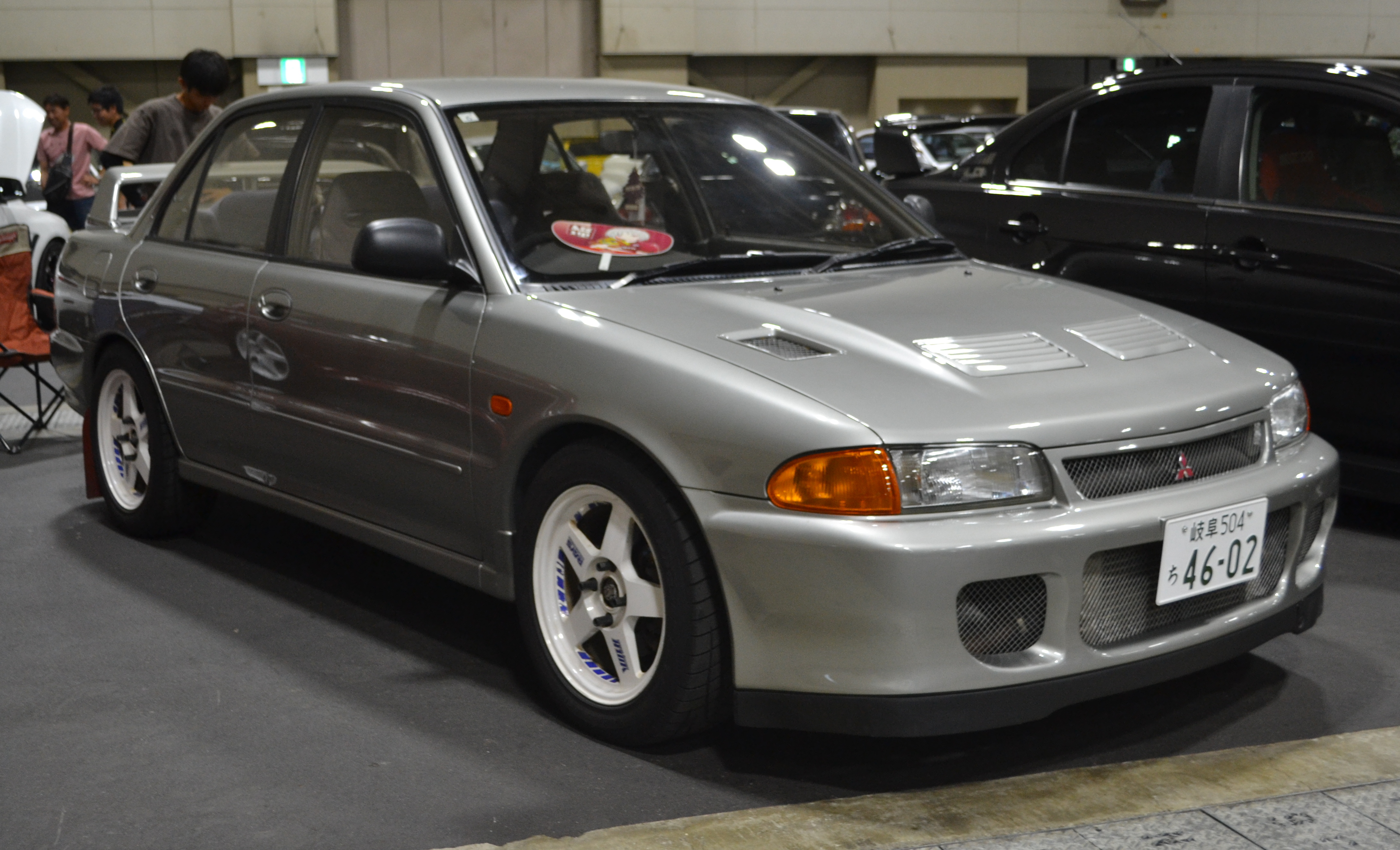
- Lancer GSR Evolution II

Overview
- Production: January 1994 – February 1995

Body and chassis
- Platform: CE9A
- Related: Mitsubishi Lancer sixth generation

Powertrain
- Engine: 2.0 L 4G63T turbo I4
- Transmission: 5-speed manual

Dimensions
- Wheelbase: 2,510 mm (98.8 in)
- Length: 4,310 mm (169.7 in)
- Width: 1,695 mm (66.7 in)
- Height: 1,420 mm (55.9 in)
- Curb weight: 1,180–1,250 kg (2,601–2,756 lb)

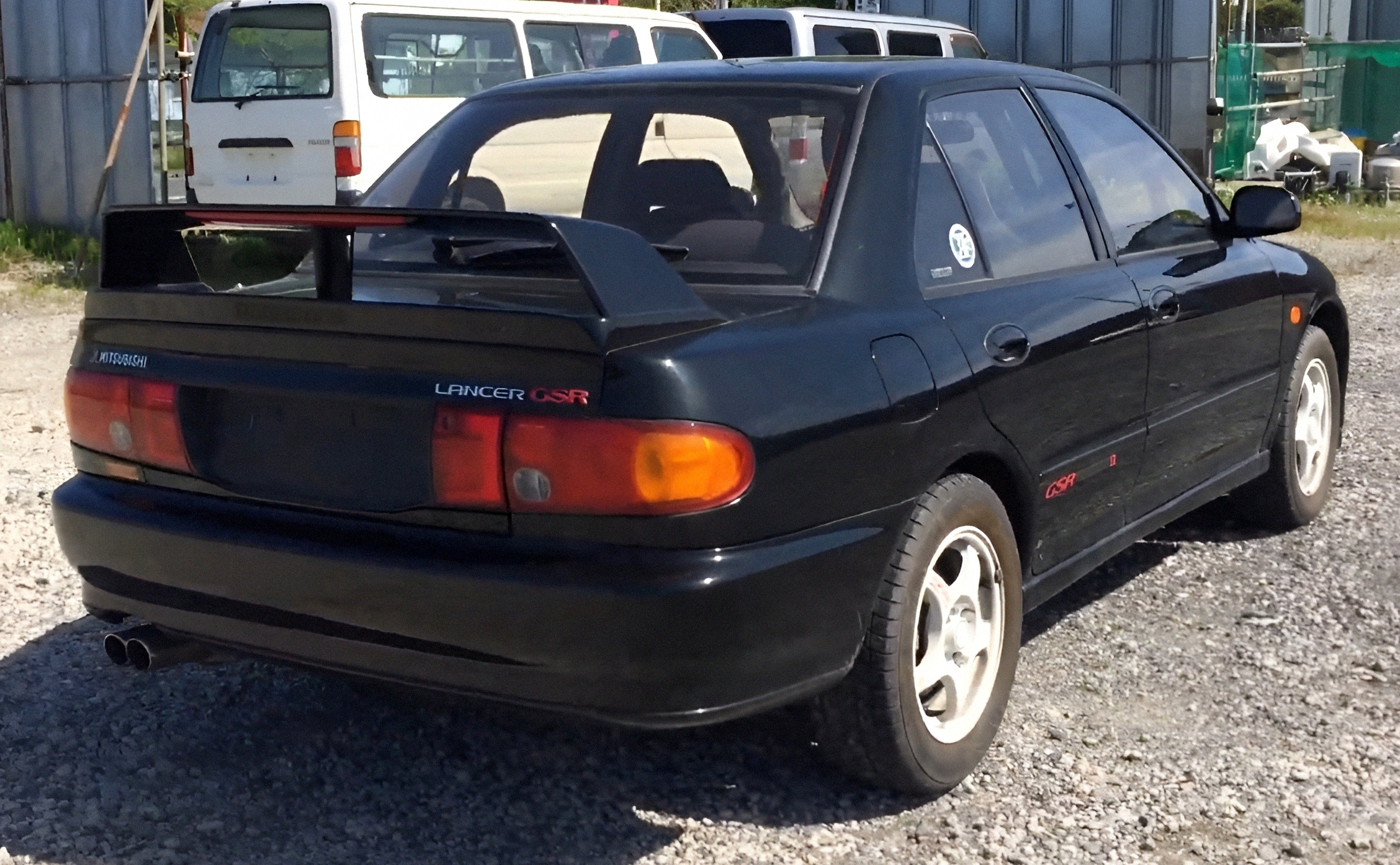
Rear

The Evolution II was upgraded in December 1993, and was produced until February 1995. It mainly consisted of handling improvements, including minor wheelbase adjustments, lighter front swaybar that connected via swaybar links to the front struts, bodywork tweaks including a larger spoiler, and tires that were 10 mm (0.4 in) wider. This Evolution also has a 50 L (13.2 US gal; 11.0 imp gal) fuel tank. Power output was increased to 260 PS (191 kW; 256 hp) from the same engine and torque was unchanged for both GSR and RS models. Most cars came with 15-inch (38 cm) OZ 5-spoke wheels from the factory, although the RS models (mostly sold to privateer racing teams) left the factory with steel wheels.

== Evolution III ==
Third generation
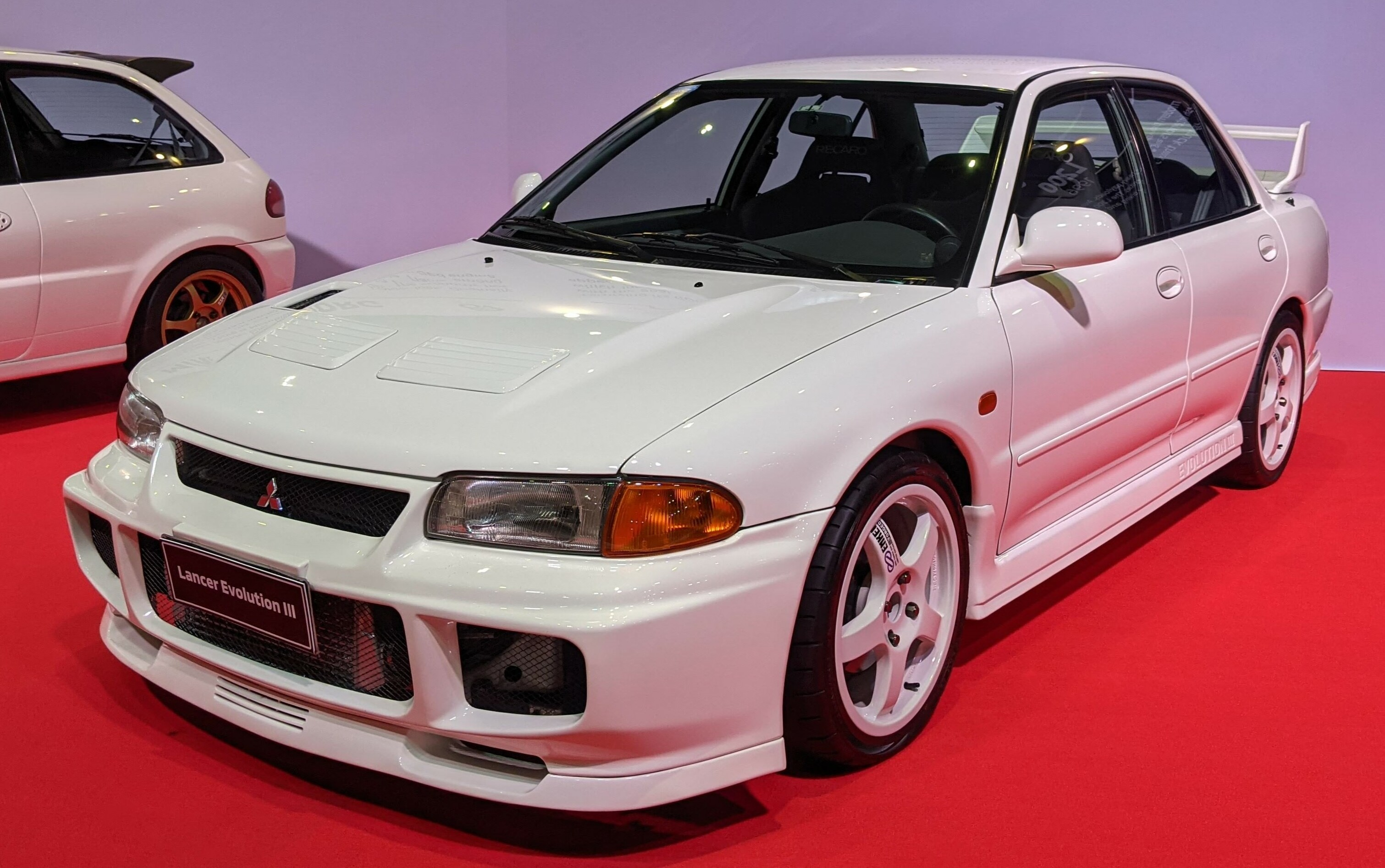

Overview
- Production: February 1995 – August 1996

Body and chassis
- Platform: CE9A
- Related: Mitsubishi Lancer sixth generation

Powertrain
- Engine: 2.0 L 4G63T turbo I4
- Transmission: 5-speed manual

Dimensions
- Wheelbase: 2,510 mm (98.8 in)
- Length: 4,310 mm (169.7 in)
- Width: 1,695 mm (66.7 in)
- Height: 1,420 mm (55.9 in)
- Curb weight: 1,190–1,260 kg (2,624–2,778 lb)

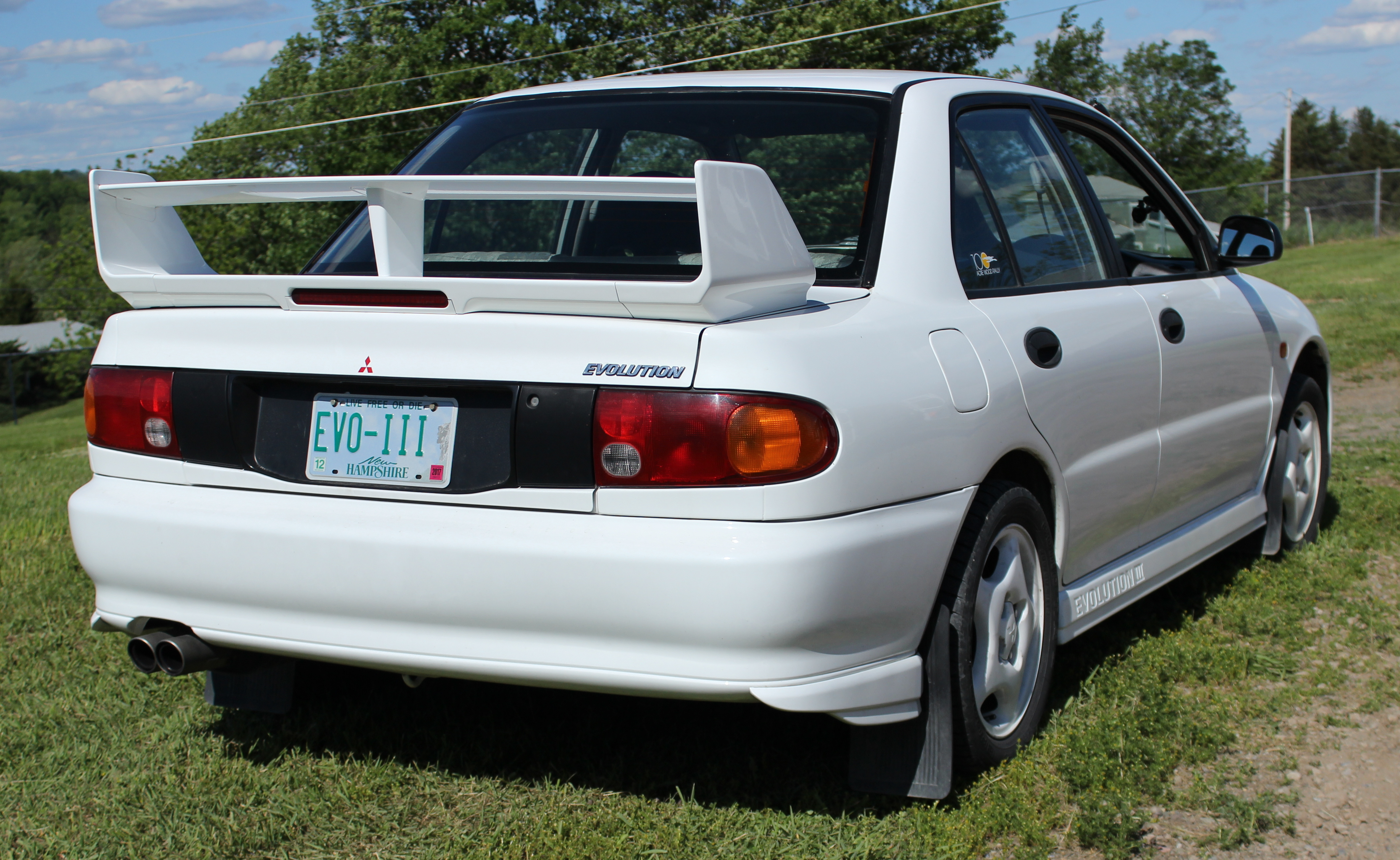
Rear

February 1995 saw the arrival of the Evolution III, following a pre-release in 1993 which had several improvements over the previous models. New, more aggressive styling and a new nose moulding improved the air supply to the radiator, intercooler and brakes. New side skirts and rear bumper moldings and a larger rear spoiler were added to reduce lift. The engine was improved and had a higher compression ratio than before, and a new turbocharger compressor (65 mm to 68 mm), which resulted in a power output of 270 PS (199 kW; 266 hp) at 6,250 rpm and torque of 309 N⋅m (228 lb⋅ft) at 3,000 rpm. As per the previous Evolution II, an RS model was available.

A total of 10,080 examples of the Evolution III were built, 8,998 being GSRs and 1,082 being RS models.

== Evolution IV ==
Fourth generation
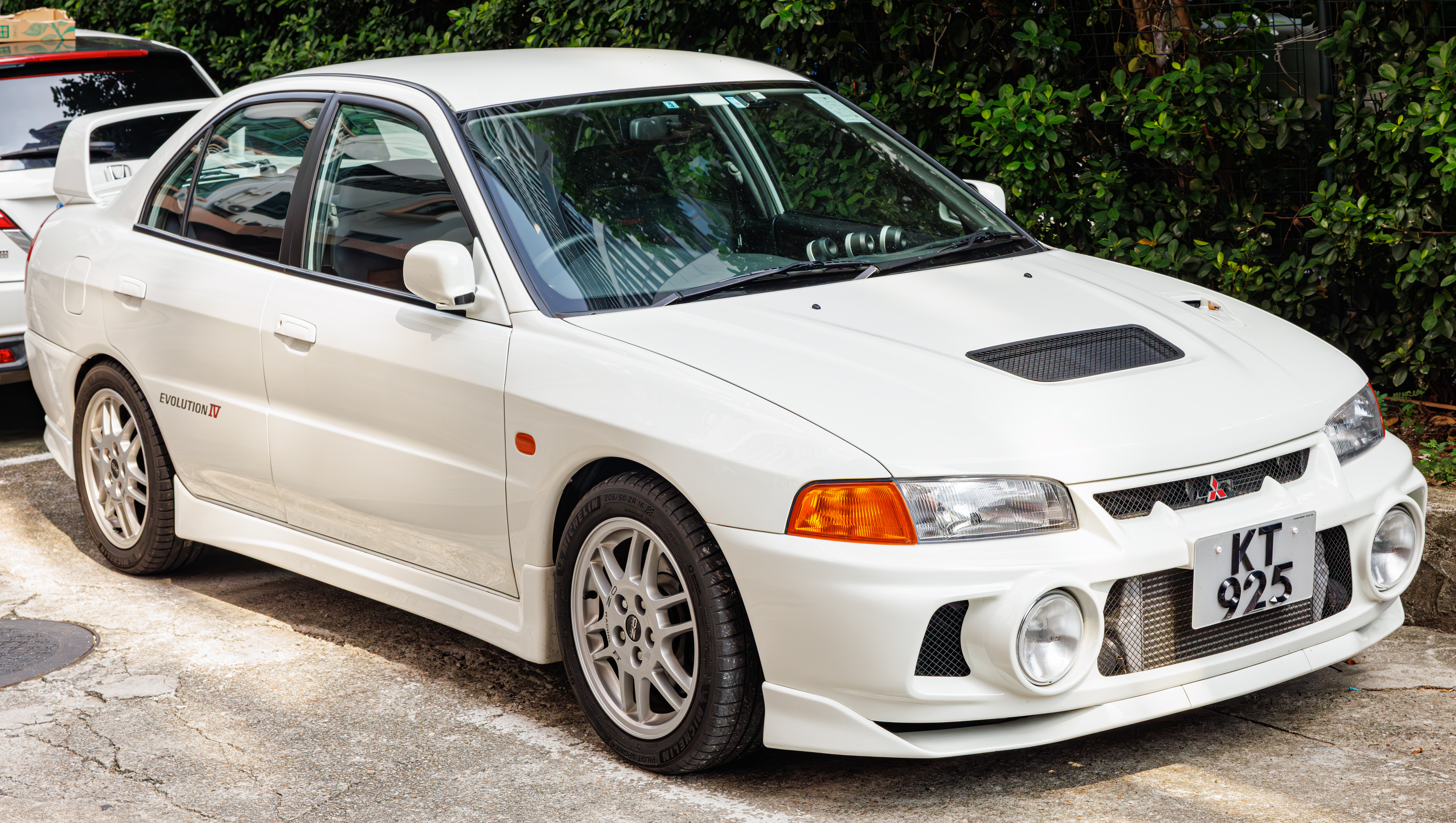

Overview
- Production: August 1996 – January 1998

Body and chassis
- Platform: CN9A
- Related: Mitsubishi Lancer seventh generation

Powertrain
- Engine: 2.0 L 4G63T turbo I4
- Transmission: 5-speed manual

Dimensions
- Wheelbase: 2,510 mm (98.8 in)
- Length: 4,330 mm (170.5 in)
- Width: 1,690 mm (66.5 in)
- Height: 1,415 mm (55.7 in)
- Curb weight: 1,260–1,370 kg (2,778–3,020 lb)

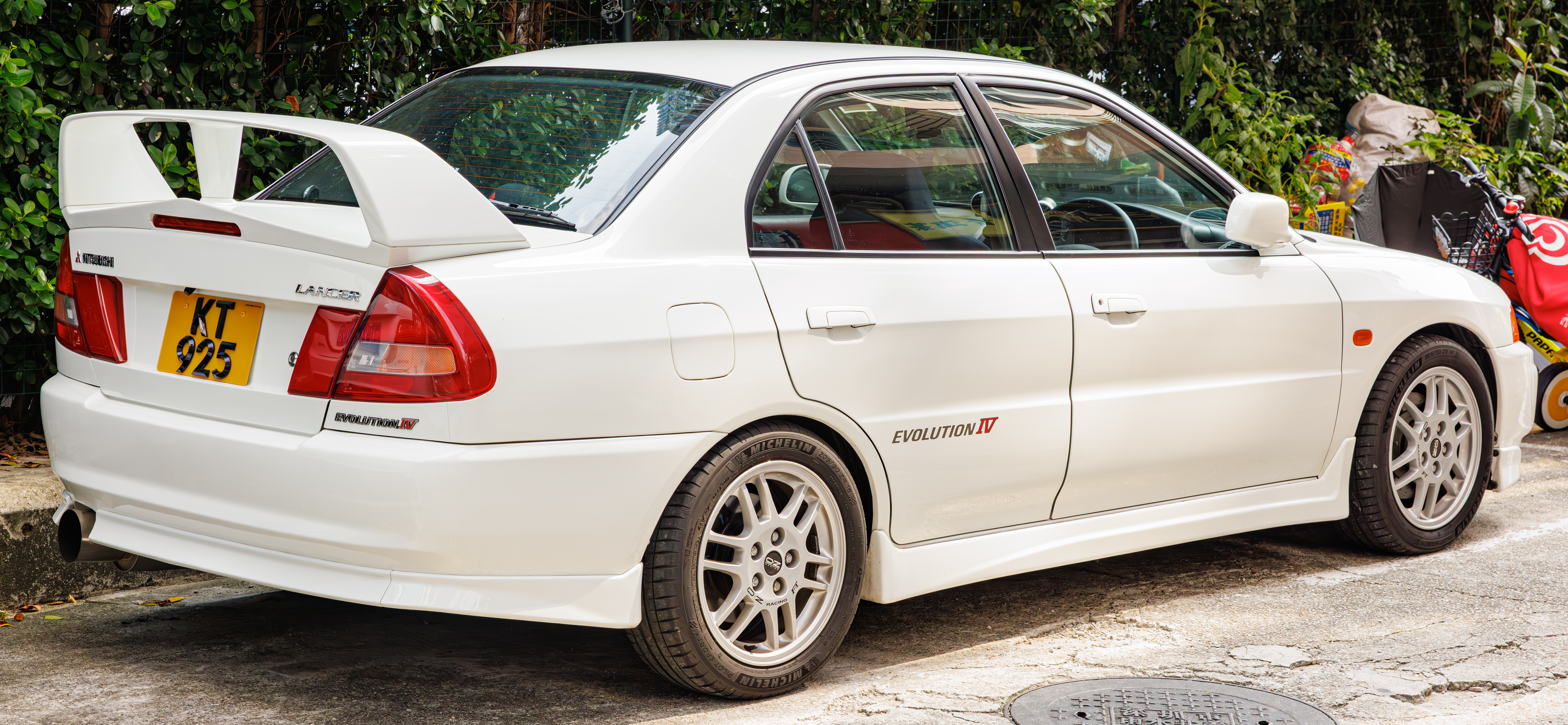
Rear

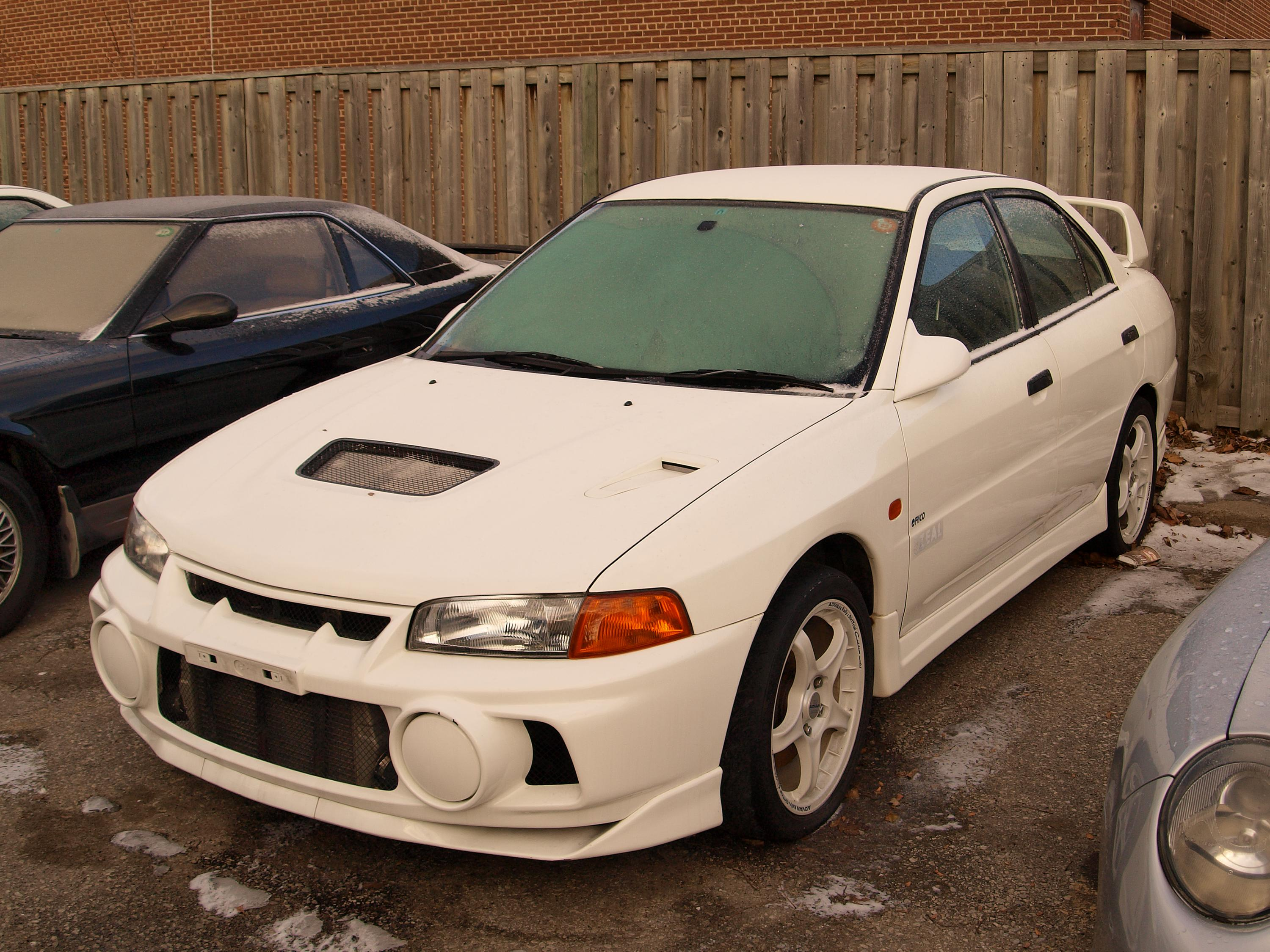
Lancer Evolution IV RS

The Lancer platform was redesigned in 1996, and along with it, the Evolution. The engine and transaxle were rotated 180° to better balance the weight and eliminate torque steer.

There were two versions available, the RS and GSR. The RS version was produced as a competition car with a limited-slip front differential and a friction-type LSD at the rear. It also came with GLX seats and a choice of either 15-inch or 16-inch (41 cm) OZ lightweight racing wheels. The RS also had wind-up windows, optional air conditioning in some models, and a few extra brace bars to strengthen the chassis, one behind the front grille and another across the boot floor, and an aluminum rear strut tower brace.

The GSR and the RS shared a new twin-scroll turbocharger which helped to improve response and increase power to 280 PS (206 kW; 276 hp) at 6,500 rpm and 353 N⋅m (260 lb⋅ft) torque at 3,000 rpm. Mitsubishi's new Active Yaw Control appeared as a factory standard on the GSR model, which used steering, throttle input sensors and g sensors to computer-hydraulically control torque split individually to the rear wheels. Mitsubishi had planned to produce only 6,000 Evolution IVs, which were completely sold out just three days after its release. Subsequently, the total was increased to 9,000 to satiate the demand for the vehicle.

The Evolution IV can be distinguished by its two large fog lights in the front bumper (option on RS version), and the newly designed tail lights on the rear, which became a standard design to Evolution V, which would become yet another trademark of the Evolution series, note the RS has no light mounts on the boot/trunk for further weight saving.

This new generation was slightly heavier than previous Evo's—the GSR in particular due to the added technology systems—but to counter this, the car produced even more power—the weight of the RS being 1,260 kg (2,778 lb) and the GSR being 1,345 kg (2,965 lb) (sunroof model 1,370 kg (3,020 lb)).

Much of the technical improvements for this generation were also used in the second-generation Mitsubishi RVR originally sold only in Japan but since exported to Australia and New Zealand. The Evolution IV was the last model to be considered "compact" according to Japanese dimension regulations.

- RS – "Rally Sport" – Shortened close-ratio 5-speed transmission, minimal interior, front worm-gear LSD and rear 1.5-way LSD, front end crossbar, 15-inch steel wheels, Lancer GLXi Front Seats (non-bucket seats), manual windows and mirrors. (Optional: manual air conditioning, PIAA front fog lights, anti-lock brakes, Lamco-Mitsubishi boost gauge.)
- GSR – "Gran Sport Racing" – 5-speed manual transmission, AYC (Active Yaw Control), anti-lock brakes, black-red Recaro front bucket seats, Driver and Passenger-side Airbag, full auto air conditioner, Single DIN AM/FM/Cassette Stereo player with rear windscreen integrated antenna, PIAA front fog lights, power windows, 16-inch OZ Racing F1 wheels, rear windscreen wiper, optional: sunroof, Lamco-Mitsubishi boost gauge, 5-inch (13 cm) Double DIN TV Tuner/CD Player head unit.

== Evolution V ==
Fifth generation
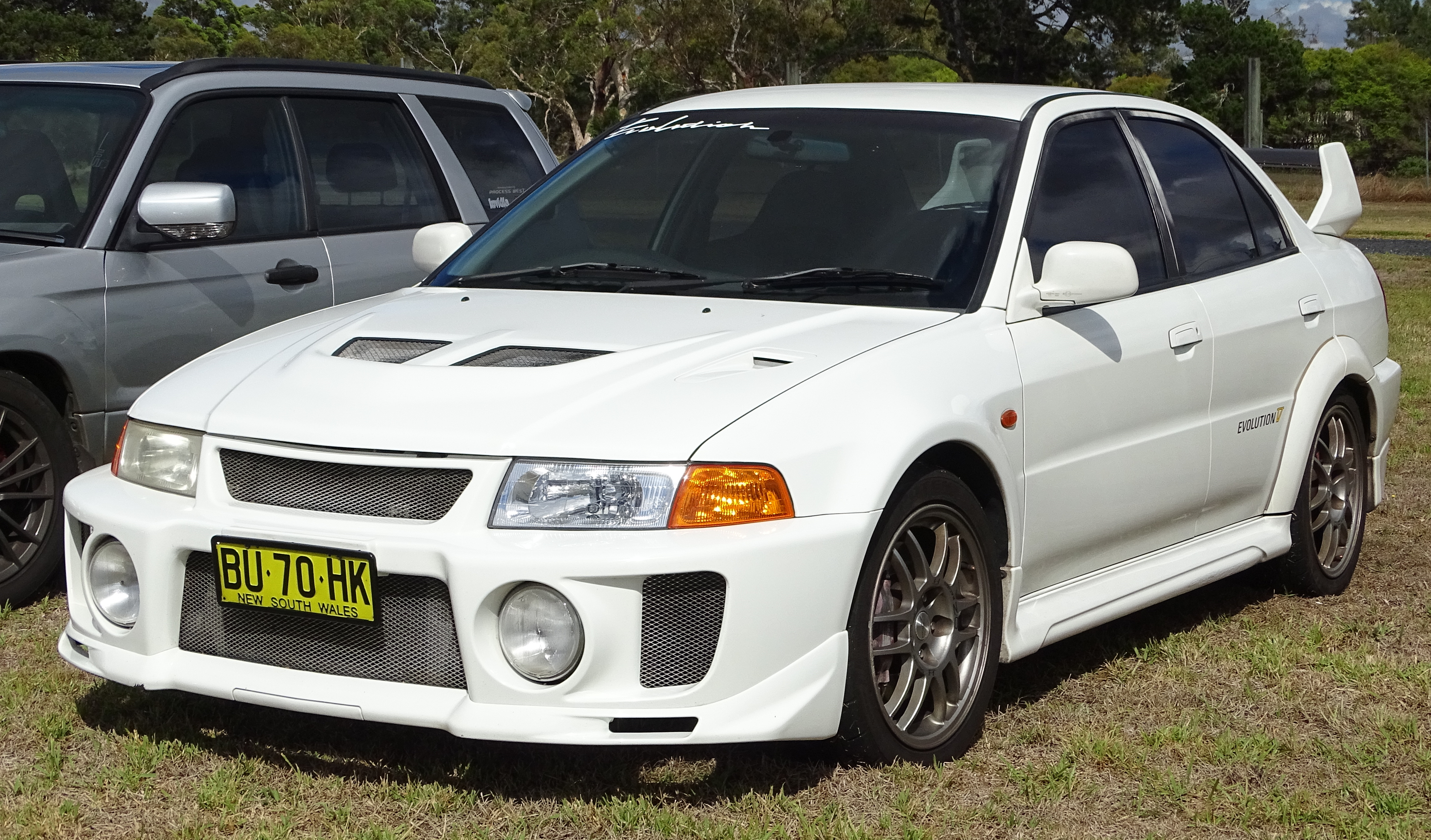

Overview
- Production: January 1998 - January 1999

Body and chassis
- Platform: CP9A
- Related: Mitsubishi Lancer seventh generation

Powertrain
- Engine: 2.0 L 4G63T turbo I4
- Transmission: 5-speed manual

Dimensions
- Wheelbase: 2,510 mm (98.8 in)
- Length: 4,350 mm (171.3 in)
- Width: 1,770 mm (69.7 in)
- Height: 1,405–1,415 mm (55.3–55.7 in)
- Curb weight: 1,260–1,360 kg (2,778–2,998 lb)

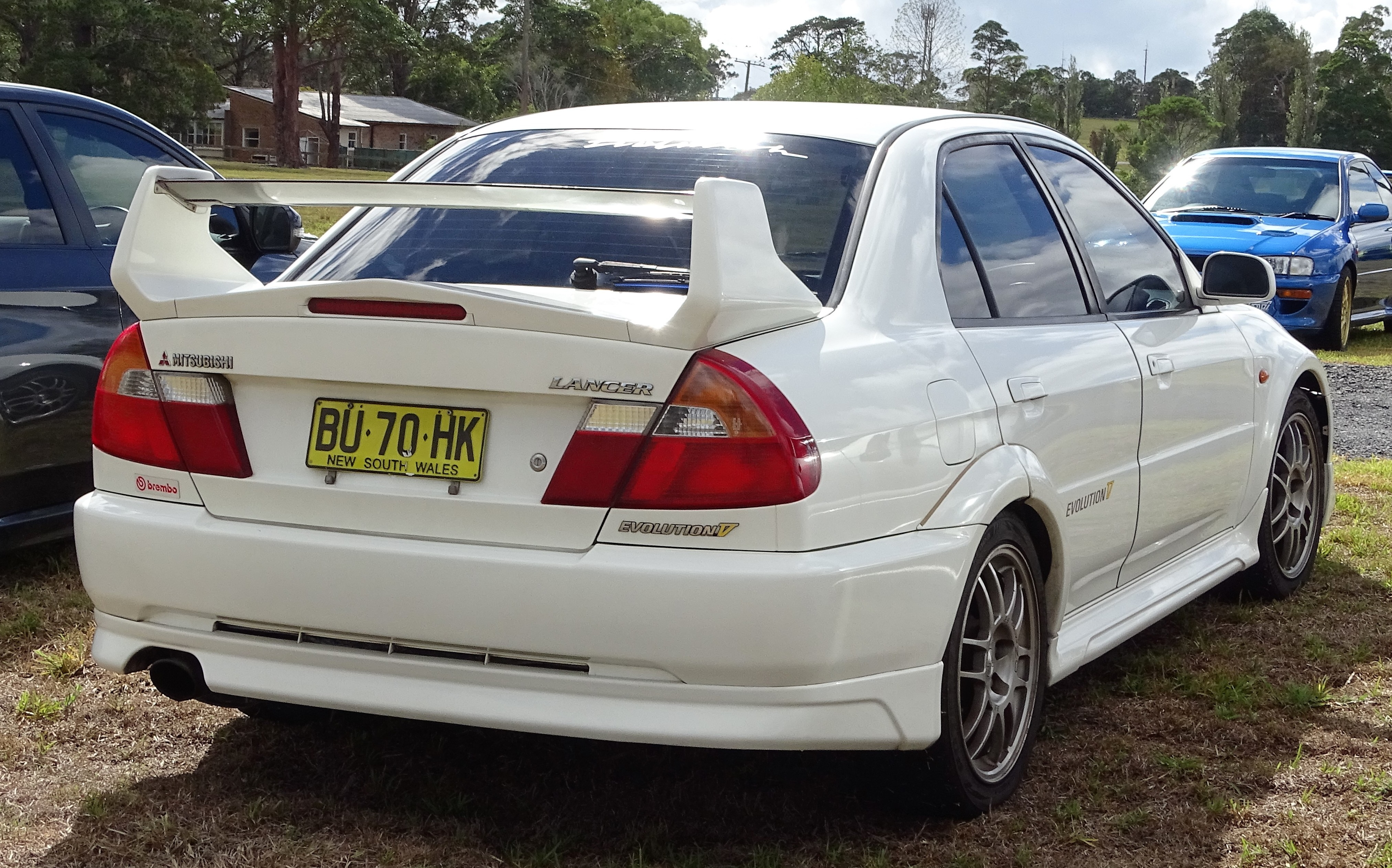
Rear

Many aspects of the car were changed such as:

- The interior was upgraded in the GSR version with a better class of Recaro seats.
- The body kit had flared arches at the front and rear and a new aluminum rear spoiler replaced the IV FRP version and gave an adjustable angle of attack to alter rear downforce. (In process of doing so, the Evolution V onwards was no longer considered "compact" according to Japanese dimension regulations, as the car was now 70 mm (2.8 in) wider than regulated limit of 1,700 mm (66.9 in)).
- The track was widened by 10 mm (0.4 in), the wheel offset changed from ET45 to ET38 along with the wheel diameter which rose from 16 inches to 17 inches to accommodate Brembo brakes.
- The brake master cylinder bore increased by 0.3 mm (0.01 in).
- The engine was strengthened in a few areas and the cam duration was increased. The pistons were lighter with a smaller skirt area. 510-cc injectors were replaced with 560-cc injectors for better engine reliability due to more electrical "headroom" and the ECU was changed to include a flash ROM, allowing more boost pressure to the same TD05-HR turbocharger as the Mitsubishi Evolution IV.

Furthermore, the turbocharger was again improved. Torque was increased to 372.6 N⋅m (275 lb⋅ft) at 3,000 rpm. Power officially stayed the same, at 280 PS (206 kW; 276 hp).

- RS – "rally sport" close-ratio 5-speed manual transmission, minimal interior, rally suspension, 1.5-way limited-slip differential, (auto air conditioner, Enkei wheels, Recaro bucket seats, Brembo brakes, power windows are available as an option).
- GSR – 5-speed manual transmission, gauge pack, AYC (Active Yaw Control), anti-lock brakes, driver and passenger-side airbags, Recaro front bucket and rear seats, auto air conditioner, single DIN AM/FM/cassette stereo player, power windows, and Brembo brakes It still retains the distinctive features of the IV generation, such as the large fog lights.

== Evolution VI ==
Sixth generation
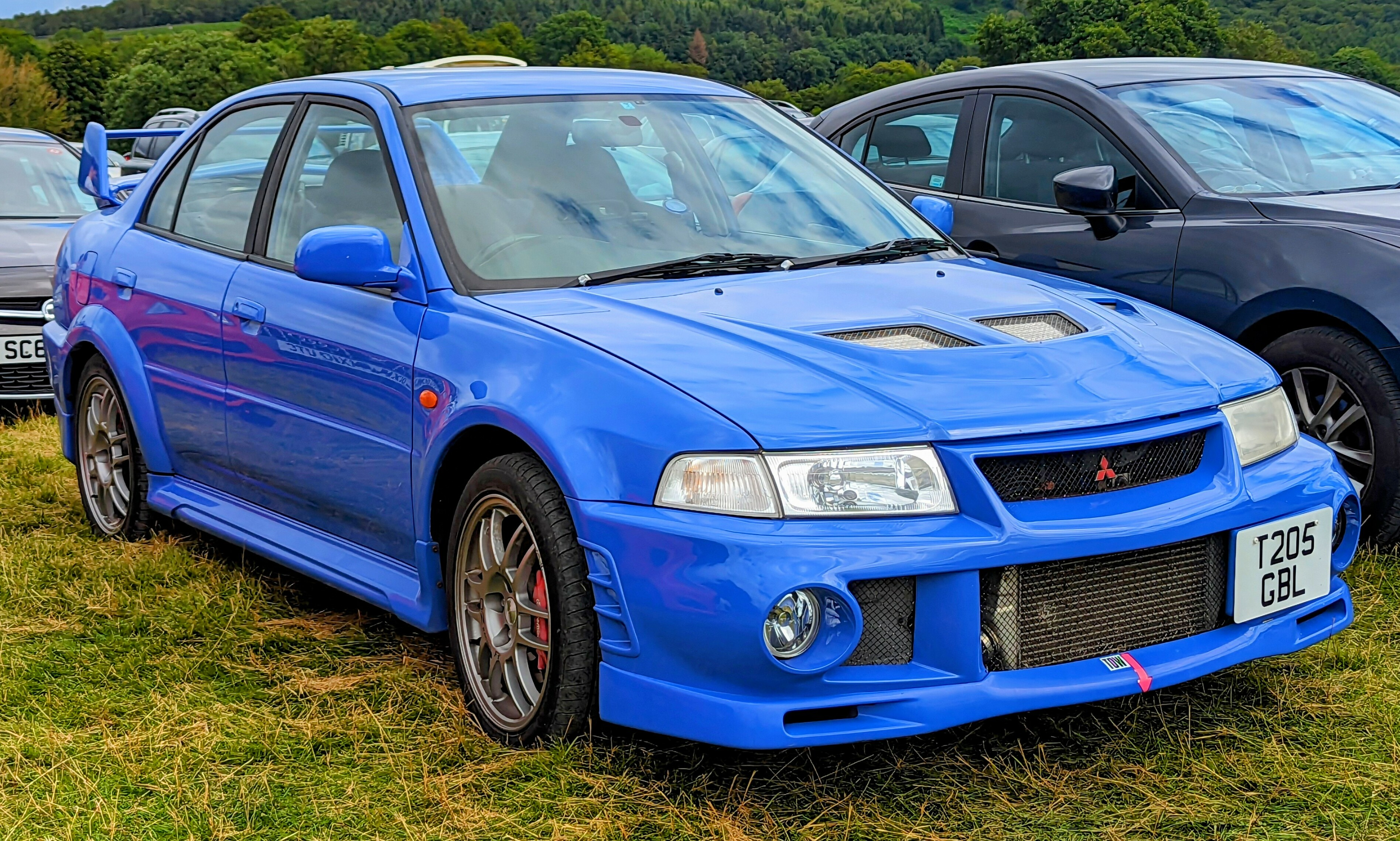

Overview
- Production: January 1999 – August 2001

Body and chassis
- Platform: CP9A
- Related: Mitsubishi Lancer seventh generation

Powertrain
- Engine: 1997 cc 4G63 turbo I4
- Power output: 280 PS (276 hp; 206 kW) and 373 N⋅m (275 lb⋅ft) of torque
- Transmission: 5-speed manual

Dimensions
- Wheelbase: 2,510 mm (98.8 in)
- Length: 4,350 mm (171.3 in)
- Width: 1,770 mm (69.7 in)
- Height: 1,405–1,415 mm (55.3–55.7 in)
- Curb weight: 1,260–1,360 kg (2,778–2,998 lb)

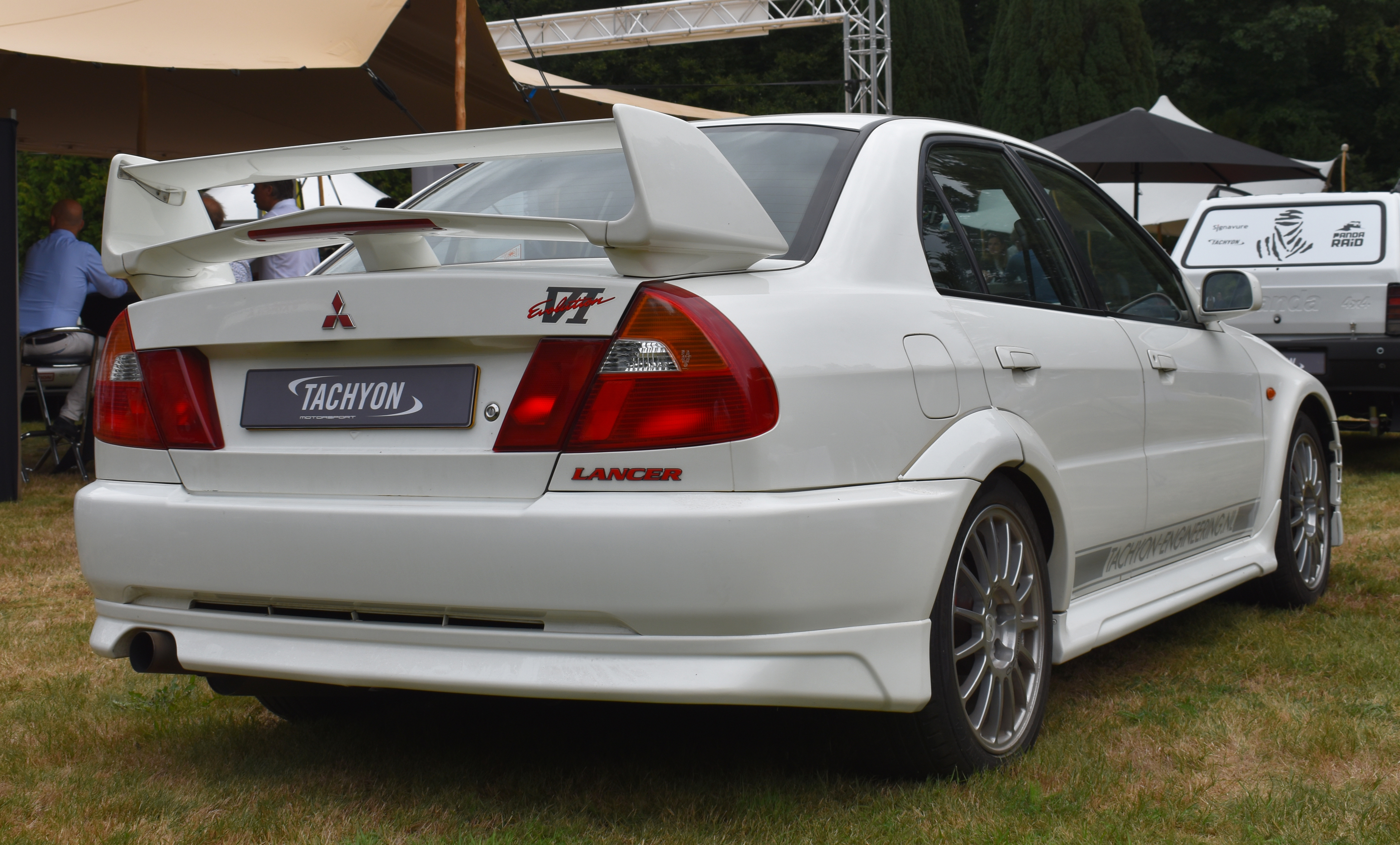
Rear

The Evolution VI's changes mainly focused on cooling and engine durability. It received a larger intercooler, larger oil cooler, and new pistons, along with a titanium-aluminide turbine wheel for the RS model, the first in a production car. Output was rated at 280 PS (276 hp; 206 kW) at 6,500 rpm and maximum torque of 373 N⋅m (275 lb⋅ft) at 3,000 rpm.

The Evolution VI received new bodywork yet again, with the most easily noticeable change being within the front bumper where the big fog lights were reduced in size and moved to the corners for better airflow. A new model was added to the GSR and RS lineup; known as the RS2, it was an RS with a few of the GSR's options. Another limited-edition RS was known as the RS Sprint, an RS tuned by Ralliart in the UK to be lighter and more powerful with 330 hp (246 kW).

Yet another special edition Evolution VI was released in December 1999: the Tommi Mäkinen Edition, named after Finnish rally driver Tommi Mäkinen who had won Mitsubishi four WRC drivers championships. It featured a different front bumper, Red/Black Recaro seats (with embossed T. Mäkinen logo), 17-inch white Enkei wheels, a leather Momo steering wheel and shift knob, a titanium turbine that spooled up more quickly, front upper strut brace, lowered ride height (with tarmac stages in mind), and a quicker steering ratio. Amongst other colours, the Evo VI came in either red (Tommi Mäkinen Edition only), white, blue, black or silver with optional special decals, replicating Tommi Mäkinen's rally car's colour scheme. This car is also sometimes referred to as an Evolution 6 1/2, Evolution 6.5, or TME for short. 4,092 units were produced in total and exterior styling was similar to that of its predecessor, the Mitsubishi Lancer Evolution V.

=== Standard models ===
- RS – "rally sport" minimal interior, rally suspension, rear 1.5-way limited-slip differential as opposed to AYC, shortened close-ratio 5-speed manual transmission, optional Enkei wheels, optional Recaro seats, optional air conditioning, optional Brembo brakes, optional power windows.
- GSR – 5-speed manual transmission, gauge pack, AYC (Active Yaw Control), anti-lock brakes, Recaro front bucket and rear seat, auto air conditioner, double-DIN audio, power windows, and Brembo brakes.

=== Tommi Mäkinen Edition models ===
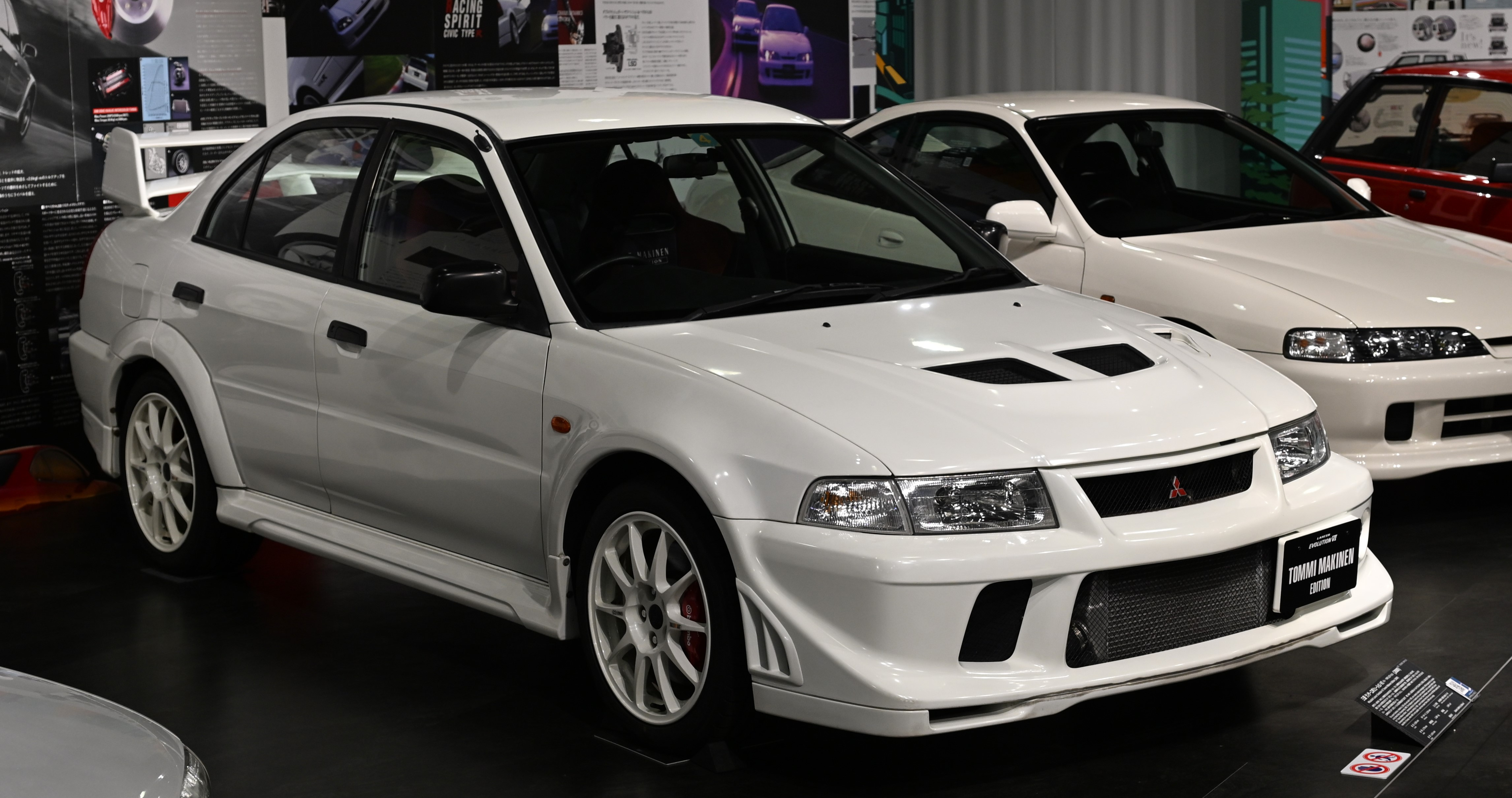
2000 Lancer Evolution VI Tommi Mäkinen Edition

- RS – same as standard RS with close-ratio 5-speed transmission, lowered ride height, Tommi Mäkinen Edition front bumper, and titanium turbine (option with standard RS).
- GSR – same as standard GSR with lowered ride height, Tommi Mäkinen Edition front bumper, Red/Black/Green Recaro seats (with embossed T. Mäkinen logo), 17-inch Enkei white wheels and titanium turbine.

== Evolution VII ==
Seventh generation
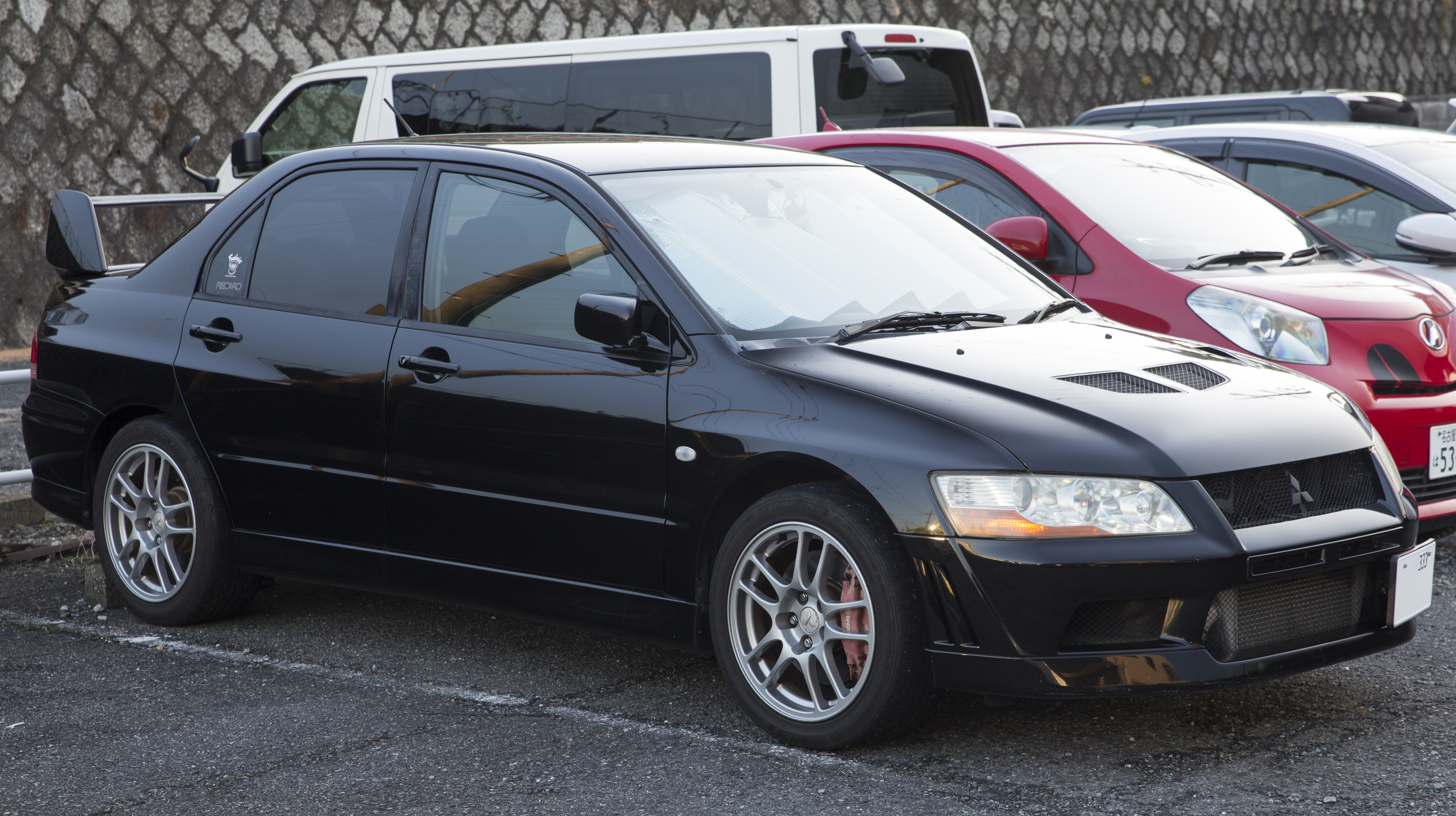

Overview
- Production: August 2001 – January 2003

Body and chassis
- Platform: CT9A
- Related: Mitsubishi Lancer eighth generation

Powertrain
- Engine: 1997 cc 4G63T turbo I4
- Transmission: 5-speed manual; 5-speed Jatco W5A51 automatic

Dimensions
- Wheelbase: 2,625 mm (103.3 in)
- Length: 4,455 mm (175.4 in)
- Width: 1,770 mm (69.7 in)
- Height: 1,450 mm (57.1 in)
- Curb weight: 1,310–1,400 kg (2,888–3,086 lb)

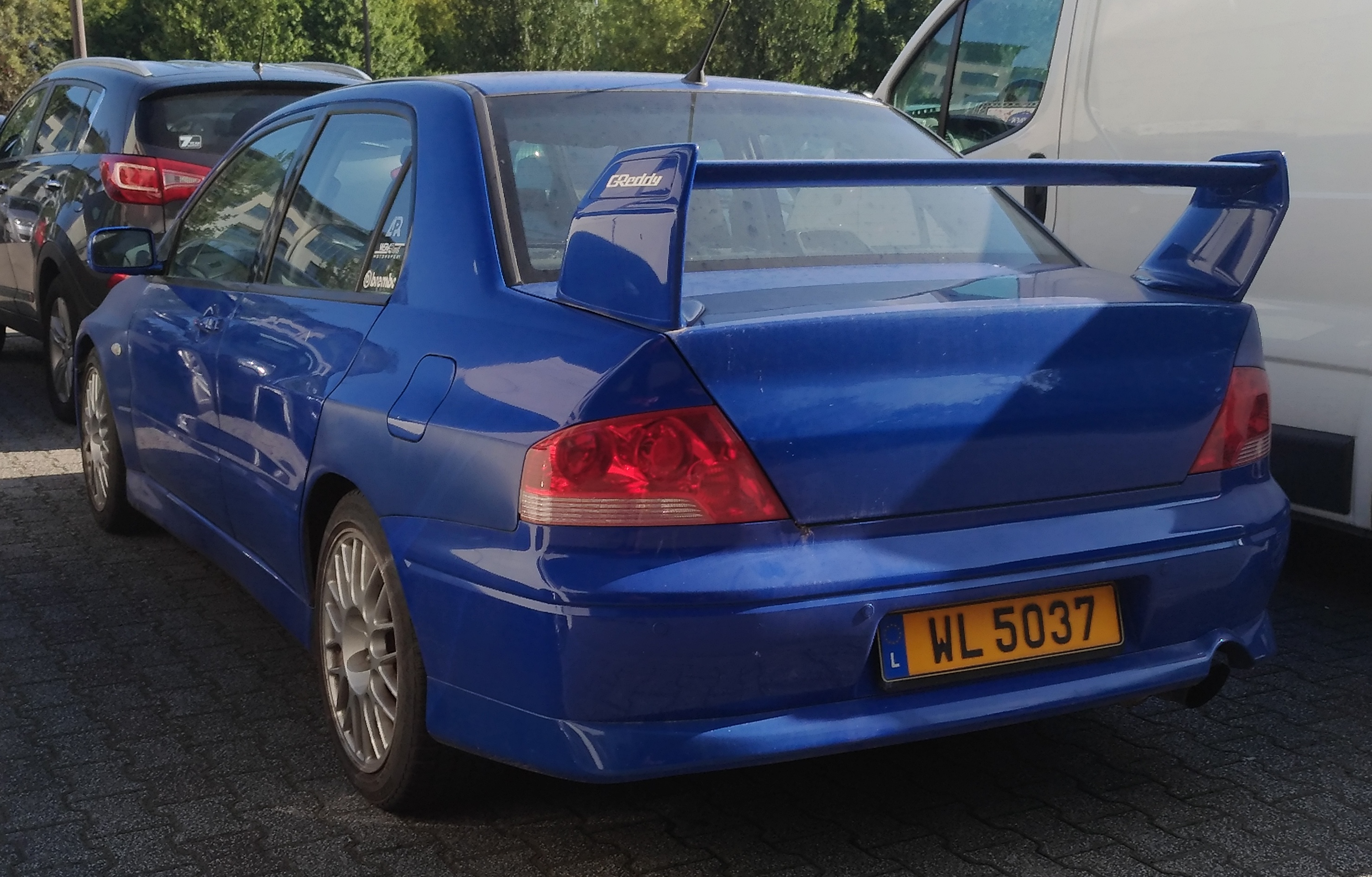
Rear

In 2001, Mitsubishi was forced by the FIA to run in the WRC using WRC rules for building a car instead of the Group A class rules, and thus did not need to follow homologation rules. The Evolution VII was based on the larger Lancer Cedia platform and as a result gained more weight over the Evolution VI, but Mitsubishi made up for this with multiple important chassis tweaks. The biggest change was the addition of an active center differential and a more effective limited-slip differential, while a front helical limited-slip differential was added. Torque was increased again to 383 N⋅m (282 lb⋅ft) with engine tweaks that allowed greater airflow, and horsepower officially remained at 280 PS (206 kW; 276 hp). For a time, Proton entered a rebadged version called the Proton PERT.

=== Evolution VII GT-A ===
The introduction of the Evolution VII also marked the first time an automatic drivetrain was included within the model lineup—the GT-A. Nicknamed the 'Grand Touring Automatic' version of the visually similar VII GSR and the RS2, the GT-A model was only produced in 2002 and had the following distinguishing interior and exterior specification: GT-A-only diamond cut finish 17-inch (431.8 mm) alloy wheels, clear rear light lenses and all-in-one style front headlights (later used on the Evolution VIII). The GT-A had the option of either no spoiler, the short spoiler (as per the Lancer Cedia; and later used on the Evolution VIII 260) or the thunder spoiler as used on the standard Evolution VII models. The most distinguishing feature was a smooth bonnet without the NACA duct on it at all and the revised front bumper. Although offering inferior cooling capabilities, the bonnet was designed to give a cleaner line through the air with less air resistance at highway speeds.

The interior could be specified with factory options of a deluxe velour interior, full leather with 4-way power seats or the Recaro sports seats. The GT-A interior was different in that it had chromed door handles, a different instrument panel (to show the gear selection) and chrome edged bezels around the speedo and tach. The GT-A also had additional sound deadening and privacy glass installed from the factory and the engine manifold and downpipe had been engineered to be quieter.

The 5-speed W5A51 automatic gearbox had what Mitsubishi called "fuzzy logic", which meant that the car would learn what the driver's driving characteristics were like and would adapt the gear change timings and kick down reactions accordingly. The gears could be manually selected as with most Tiptronics via steering wheel + and – buttons (a pair both sides) or via selecting the tiptronic gate with the gear lever. Power was down a little from the standard manual cars with 272 PS (200 kW; 268 hp), while torque was decreased to 343 N⋅m (253 lb⋅ft). The GT-A gearbox did not appear again in the Evolution VIII but has been installed in the estate version of the Evolution IX Wagon. It was replaced by the Twin Clutch SST gearbox since the introduction of Evolution X.

The Evolution VII GT-A was launched on January 29, 2002, and it was available at the Galant and Mitsubishi Car Plaza dealers nationwide from February 1 of that same year, at a starting price of ¥3.3 million.

=== Standard models ===
- RS – "rally sport", close-ratio 5-speed, minimal interior, rally suspension, LSD, steel wheels, Recaro bucket seat, optional AYC (Active Yaw Control), "Sports" ABS (Anti-Lock braking system), Brembo brakes, double-din audio, power window are available as option. The RS was only available in Scotia White, as buyers were expected to provide their own livery.
- GSR – 5-speed, gauge pack, AYC (Active Yaw Control), Sports ABS, Recaro front bucket and rear seat, double-din audio, power window, Brembo brakes, Momo sports steering wheel.
- GT-A – Same option with GSR with 5-speed automatic transmission, gauge pack, deluxe velour interior, full leather or the Recaro sports seats, GT-A-only diamond cut finish 17-inch (430 mm) alloy wheels, clear rear light lenses and all-in-one style front headlights, and short spoiler option.

== Evolution VIII ==
Eighth generation
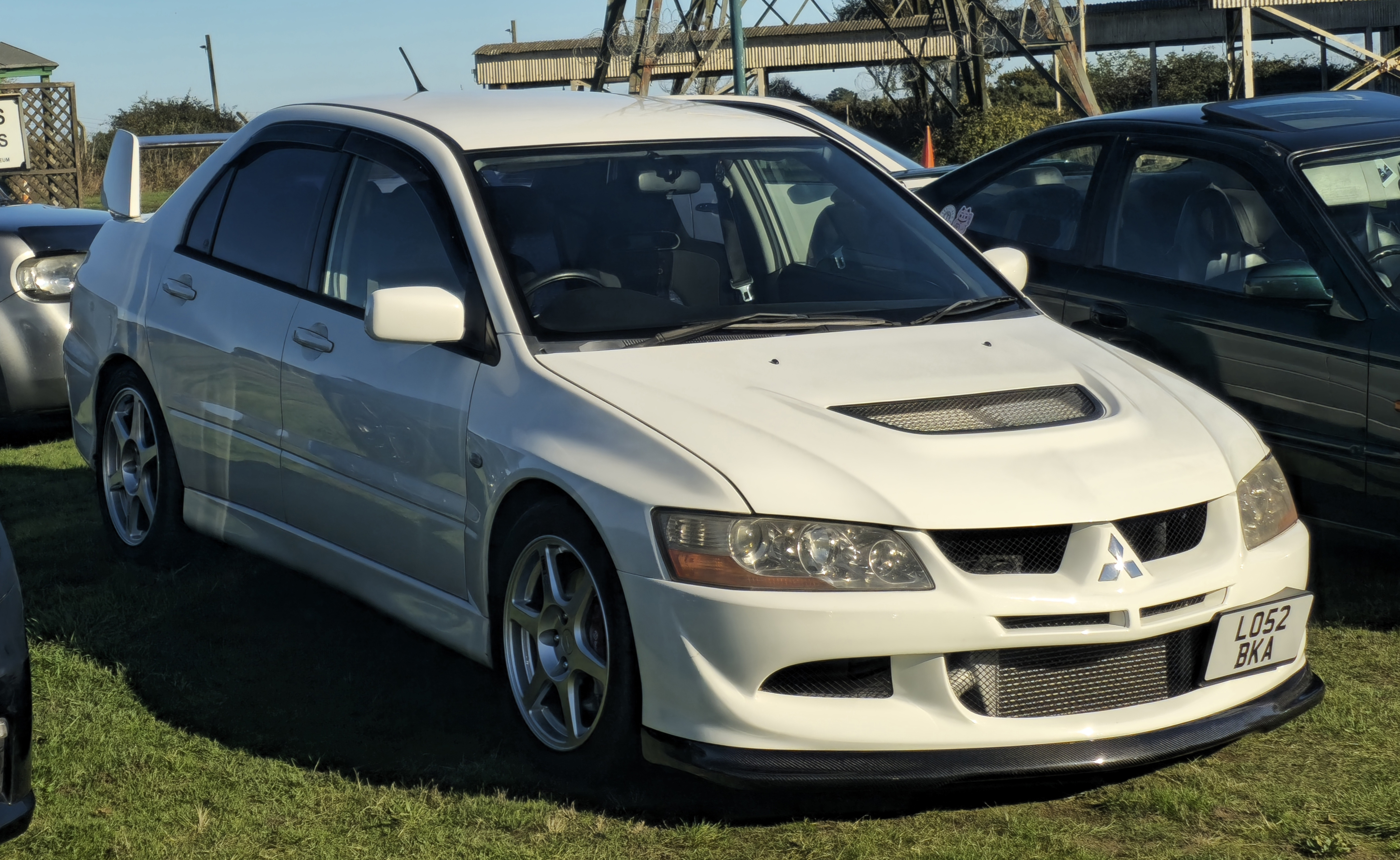

Overview
- Production: January 2003 – March 2005

Body and chassis
- Platform: CT9A
- Related: Mitsubishi Lancer eighth generation

Powertrain
- Engine: 1997 cc 4G63T turbo I4
- Power output: 280 PS (206 kW; 276 hp) and 400 N⋅m (295 lb⋅ft) of torque (MR GSR); 411 PS (302 kW; 405 hp) and 481 N⋅m (355 lb⋅ft) of torque (FQ-400)
- Transmission: 5/6-speed manual

Dimensions
- Wheelbase: 2,625 mm (103.3 in)
- Length: 4,490–4,535 mm (176.8–178.5 in)
- Width: 1,770 mm (69.7 in)
- Height: 1,450 mm (57.1 in)
- Curb weight: 1,310–1,410 kg (2,888–3,109 lb)

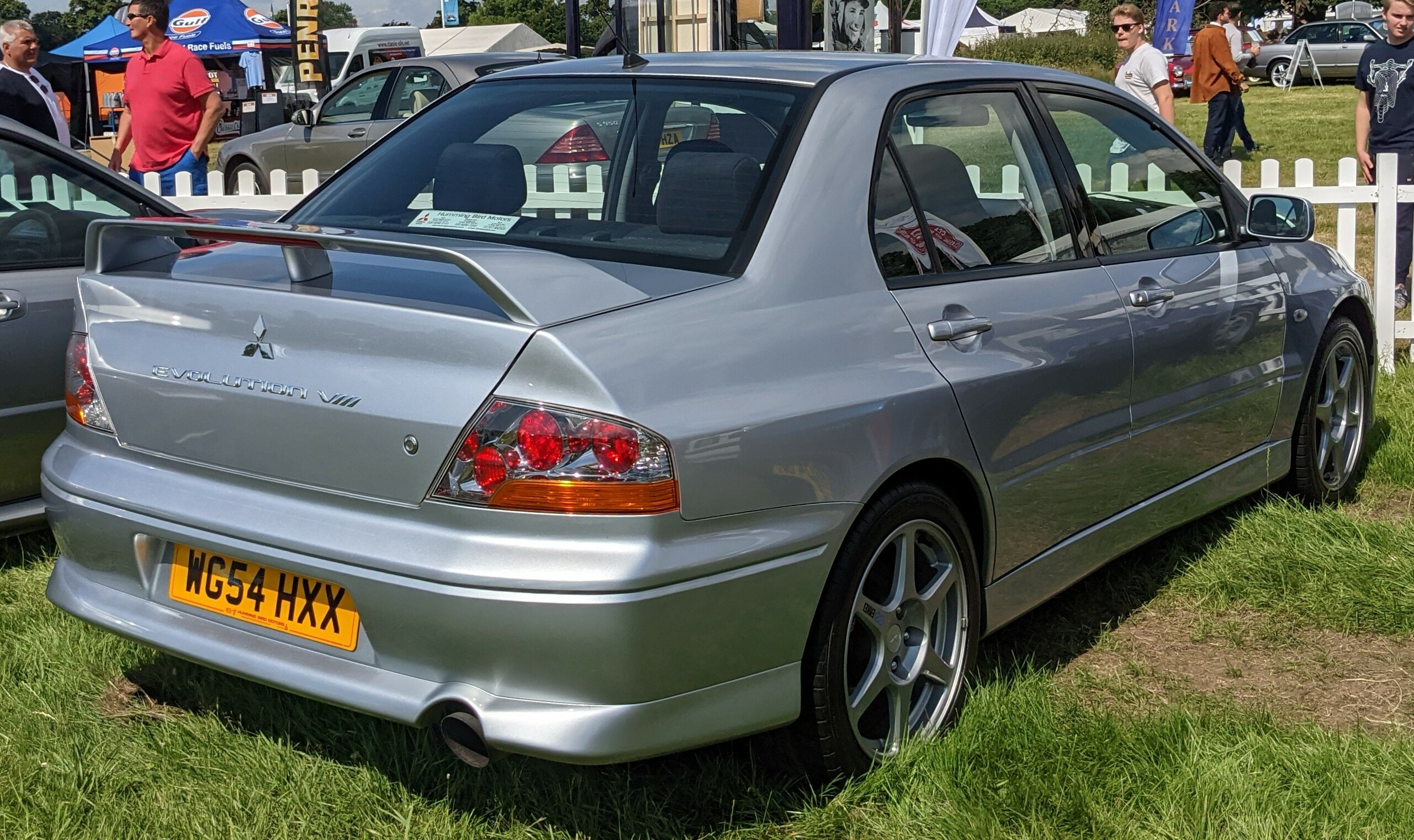
Rear

The Mitsubishi Lancer Evolution VIII appeared in 2003, this time sporting 17-inch grey Enkei wheels, Brembo brakes and Bilstein shocks to handle traction and a 5-speed manual gearbox with 280 PS (206 kW; 276 hp) (approx. 234 bhp (237 PS; 174 kW) to the wheels). Originally a one-off model, sales were so successful in the U.S. that by 2005 it was available in four trims. The standard GSR model was available in Japan. The RS model was provided with a 5-speed manual gearbox and standard wheels (lacking excess components, such as interior map lights, power windows/doors, and radio). The SSL trim package came with a sunroof, trunk mounted subwoofer, and leather seats. All of these trim levels also included chrome headlight and taillight housings. To round out the lineup, the MR came with a revised front limited-slip differential, aluminum MR shift knob, handbrake with carbon fibre handle, 17-inch BBS wheels, aluminum roof, and a 6-speed manual gearbox. Additionally, the Evolution MR's taillights and headlights sported a new black housing.

The Mitsubishi Lancer Evolution VIII MR used slick-response Bilstein shocks for improved handling. The aluminium roof panel and other reductions in body weight lowered the centre of gravity to produce more natural roll characteristics. Detail improvements have also been made to Mitsubishi's own electronic four-wheel drive, to the active center differential (ACD) 5 + Super AYC 6 traction control, and to the Sports ABS systems. The Lancer Evolution VIII displayed at the 2003 Tokyo Motor Show took the MR designation traditionally reserved for Mitsubishi Motors high-performance models (first used for the Galant GTO). Other parts on the MR include BBS alloy wheels, the aforementioned Bilstein shocks, and an aluminium roof. In the United Kingdom, many special Evolutions were introduced, including the 260, FQ300, FQ320, FQ340, and FQ400 variants. They came with 260, 305, 325, 345, and 405 hp (194, 227, 239, 254 and 302 kW), respectively.

The FQ-400, sold through Ralliart UK, produced 411 PS (302 kW; 405 hp) at 6,400 rpm and maximum torque of 481 N⋅m (355 lb⋅ft) at 5,500 rpm, from its 1,997 cc (2.0 L; 121.9 cu in) 4G63 inline-four engine, the result of special modifications by United Kingdom tuning firms Rampage Tuning, Owen Developments, and Flow Race Engines. The "FQ" name stands for F—ing Quick, although it is not officially recognized by Mitsubishi due to the vulgarity behind the abbreviation. At 202.8 hp (151.2 kW) per litre, it has one of the highest specific outputs per litre of any road car engine. With a curb weight of 1,450 kg (3,197 lb), it achieves 0–60 mph (97 km/h) in 3.5 seconds, 0–100 mph (161 km/h) in 9.1 seconds, 1/4 mile (402 m) in 12.1 seconds at 117 mph (188 km/h), and a top speed of 175 mph (282 km/h) while costing £48,000. BBC's television series Top Gear demonstrated that the stock FQ-400 could keep up with a Lamborghini Murciélago around a test track. The Stig recorded a Top Gear Power Lap Time of 1 minute and 24.8 seconds (damp track), 1.1 seconds slower than the Murciélago's time of 1 minute 23.7 seconds (dry track). In a similar test conducted by Evo magazine, the Evolution was able to lap the Bedford Autodrome faster than an Audi RS4 and a Porsche 911 Carrera 4S.

The Lancer Evolution VIII was also the first Evolution to be sold in the United States, spurred by the success of the Subaru Impreza WRX which had been released there just the year prior. The Evolution VIII found its true competition in the Subaru Impreza WRX STI model the same year as the Evolution VIII's US introduction. With its 2.0 liter, 271 hp (202 kW; 275 PS) engine, the 2003 Evolution VIII was capable of achieving a 0–100 km/h (62 mph) time of 5.1 seconds. However, the internal components for the American versions were largely stripped-down versions of the specifications for the Japanese Lancer Evolution VIII. No US-spec Evolution model prior to the Evo X has active yaw control, including the 2006 Evolution IX. The American 2003 and 2004 GSRs are without the helical limited-slip front differential and 6-speed manual transmission. The 2004 US spec RS models, however, do have a front helical limited-slip differential. All 2003, 2004 and 2005 RS and GSR models have the Japanese Evolution VII's 5-speed transmission. The MR edition was introduced to the US in 2005, with ACD and the only model with a 6-speed manual transmission. The 2005 US spec RS and GSR have the ACD standard, and the front helical limited-slip differential is now standard on all models. The boost, timing, and tuning are also significantly lower than its Japanese counterpart, allowing it to adhere to the strict emissions regulations of the United States. Starting in 2005, the US model Evolutions were also fitted with a 5,500 rpm limit on launching in first gear to protect the drivetrain.

Most Evolution VIIIs have a carbon fiber rear spoiler with matching body-color endplates. Furthermore, the US versions of the Lancer Evolution VIII 2003–2005 were given bulkier rear bumpers than their Japanese counterparts to accommodate US safety laws in the form of the metal rear crash bar. All Evolutions have lightweight aluminum front fenders and hoods.

The Evolution VIII RS does not come with power windows, locks, or mirrors, an audio system, rear wing, sound deadening material, map lamps or an anti-lock braking system. All Evolution VIII RS models sold in the US are equipped with air conditioning.

The 2005 MR/RS editions came with an aluminum roof.

Additionally, Evolution VIII MR Editions come equipped with a 6-speed manual transmission, Bilstein shocks, optional graphite grey color (unique to the Evolution VIII MR), optional BBS wheels and an optional vortex generator. The MR Edition also received engine updates and reliability changes, the engine updates include larger turbo diameter mouth, updated cam profiles, lighter balance shafts and changed from single wastegate solenoid to dual solenoid. Exterior changes included HID headlights, updated taillights, and MR rear badging. Interior updates included black suede Recaro seats with higher side bolsters, carbon-look dash trim, and MR badging on center console. Mechanical changes saw S-AWC rear diff changes, a larger oil cooler core, ion-coated piston rings, reinforced cylinder head and 5-layer head gasket compared to the 3 layer.

According to Mitsubishi Motors of North America (info from evolutionm.net) the total production sales in the U.S. for the Evolution VIII (2003–2005) was 12,846. In 2003, the production sales for the GSR was 7,167 which was the only 2003 model year. In 2004, production sales for the GSR was 1,254 and for the RS was 263 for a total of 1,517 for the 2004 model year. In 2005 production sales for the GSR was 2,880, for the RS was 282, and for the MR was 1000 for a total of 4,162 for the 2005 model year.

=== Standard models ===
- RS 5-Speed – "rally sport", revised 5-speed manual transmission, minimal interior, rally suspension, LSD, Enkei wheels, Recaro bucket seats, SAYC (Super Active Yaw Control)(Not available on USDM models), Sports ABS (Anti-Lock braking system), Brembo brakes, double-din audio, power window are available as option. Color options for U.S. model: (2004) Rally Red and Weightless White. (2005) Rally Red and Wicked White.
- RS 6-Speed – same as RS 5-Speed with Enkei wheels as standard and a 6-speed manual transmission (6MT not available on USDM RS model)(with same option available as RS 5-Speed).
- GSR – 5-speed (Some 2003 and later GSRs imported from Japan came with factory 6-speed transmission out of the MR Variant as standard) The manufacture plate will state what transmission the vehicle has from factory. gauge pack, SAYC (Super Active Yaw Control)(Not available on USDM models), Sports ABS, 17-inch Enkei alloy wheels, Recaro front bucket and rear seat, double-din audio, power windows, Brembo brakes, Momo sports steering wheel. Color options for U.S. models: (2003–2004) Apex Silver Metallic, Blue By You, Lightning Yellow, Rally Red, Tarmac Black Pearl, Weightless White. (2005) Apex Silver Metallic, Electric Blue Metallic, Lightning Yellow, Rally Red, Tarmac Black Pearl, Wicked White.

=== MR Models ===
- MR RS 5-Speed – same as RS 5-Speed, with aluminium roof, MR Badging, carbon fibre spoiler, gauge pack, grey interior color dashboard (same option as RS 5-Speed with Bilstein suspension, carbon look dash trim, black suede Recaro fabric seats, BBS alloy wheels, Vortex Generator).
- MR RS 6-Speed – same as MR RS 5-Speed with Enkei wheels as standard, engine and reliability updates, SAYC (Super Active Yaw Control)(Not available on USDM models), and 6-speed manual transmission (with same option available as MR RS 5-Speed).
- MR GSR – 6-speed close-ratio manual transmission, BBS forged alloy wheels, carbon-look dash trim, Bilstein suspension, black suede Recaro fabric seat, MR Badging, optional graphite grey color, Vortex Generator, engine and reliability updates. Color options for U.S. model: (2005) Apex Silver Metallic, Graphite Gray Pearl, Rally Red, Wicked White.

=== Safety ===
The U.S. National Highway Traffic Safety Administration has determined crash test ratings of Lancer of different model years:

Model year	Model	Type	Frontal driver rating	Frontal passenger rating	Side driver rating	Side passenger rating	4x2 Rollover
2004	Lancer Evolution	4-DR		N/A			N/A
2005	Lancer Evolution GSR	4-DR					N/A

== Evolution IX ==
Ninth generation
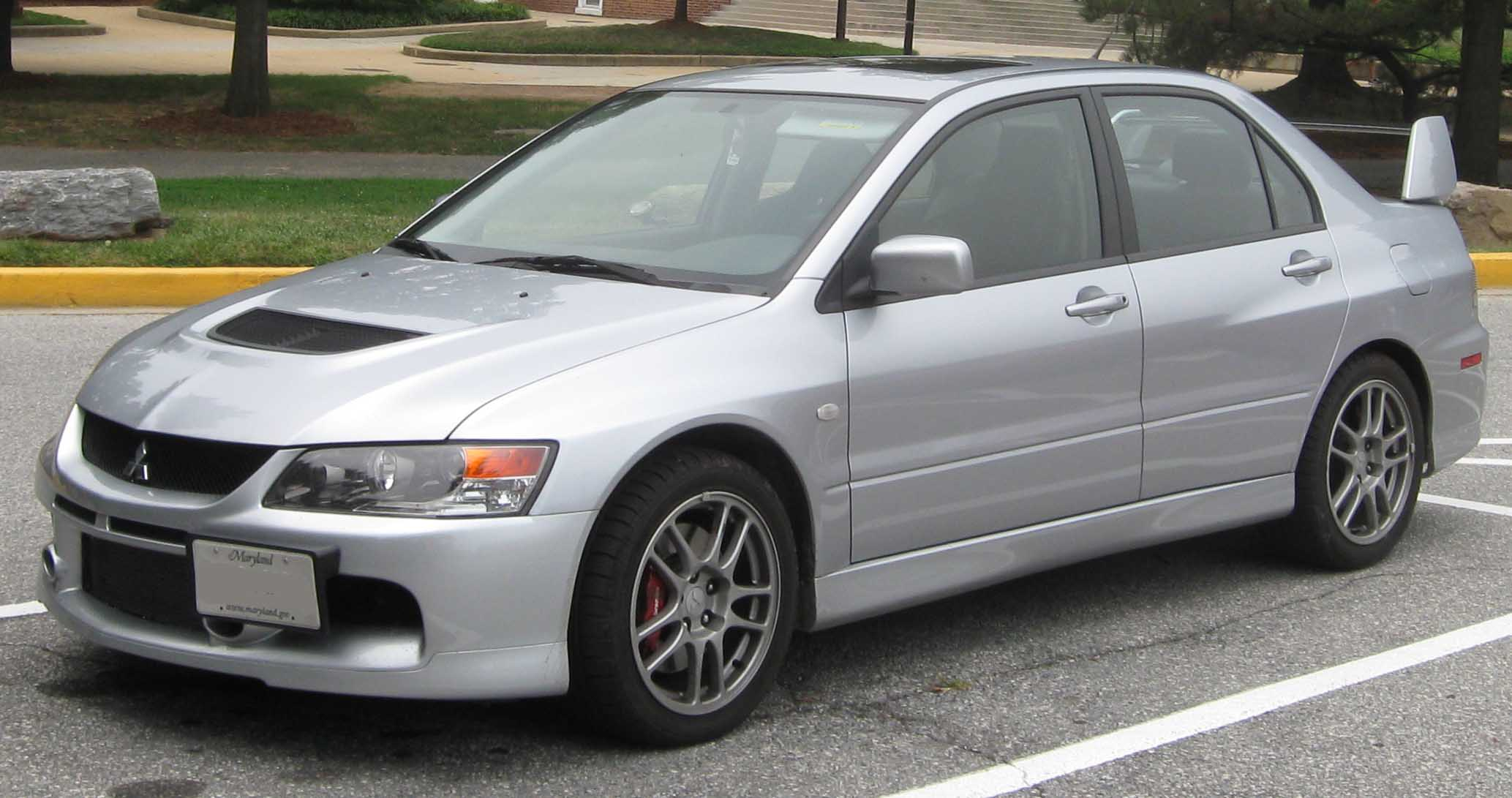

Overview
- Production: March 2005 – June 2007

Body and chassis
- Platform: CT9A; CT9W
- Related: Mitsubishi Lancer Eighth generation

Powertrain
- Engine: 1997 cc 4G63T MIVEC Turbo I4
- Power output: 291 PS (287 hp; 214 kW) and 392 N⋅m (289 lbf⋅ft) of torque
- Transmission: 5/6-speed manual; 5-Speed Jatco F5A5 automatic

Dimensions
- Wheelbase: 2,625 mm (103.3 in)
- Length: 4,490 mm (176.8 in)
- Width: 1,770 mm (69.7 in)
- Height: 1,450 mm (57.1 in)
- Curb weight: 1,310–1,490 kg (2,888–3,285 lb)

Chronology
- Successor: Mitsubishi Lancer Sportback Ralliart (for wagon model)

Mitsubishi introduced the Lancer Evolution IX in Japan on March 3, 2005, and exhibited the car at the Geneva Motor Show for the European market the same day. The North American markets saw the model exhibited at the New York International Auto Show the following month. The 2.0 L (1,997 cc) 4G63 Inline-four engine has MIVEC technology (variable valve timing), and a revised turbocharger design boosting official power output at the crankshaft to 291 PS (214 kW; 287 hp) and torque to 392 N⋅m (289 lb⋅ft).

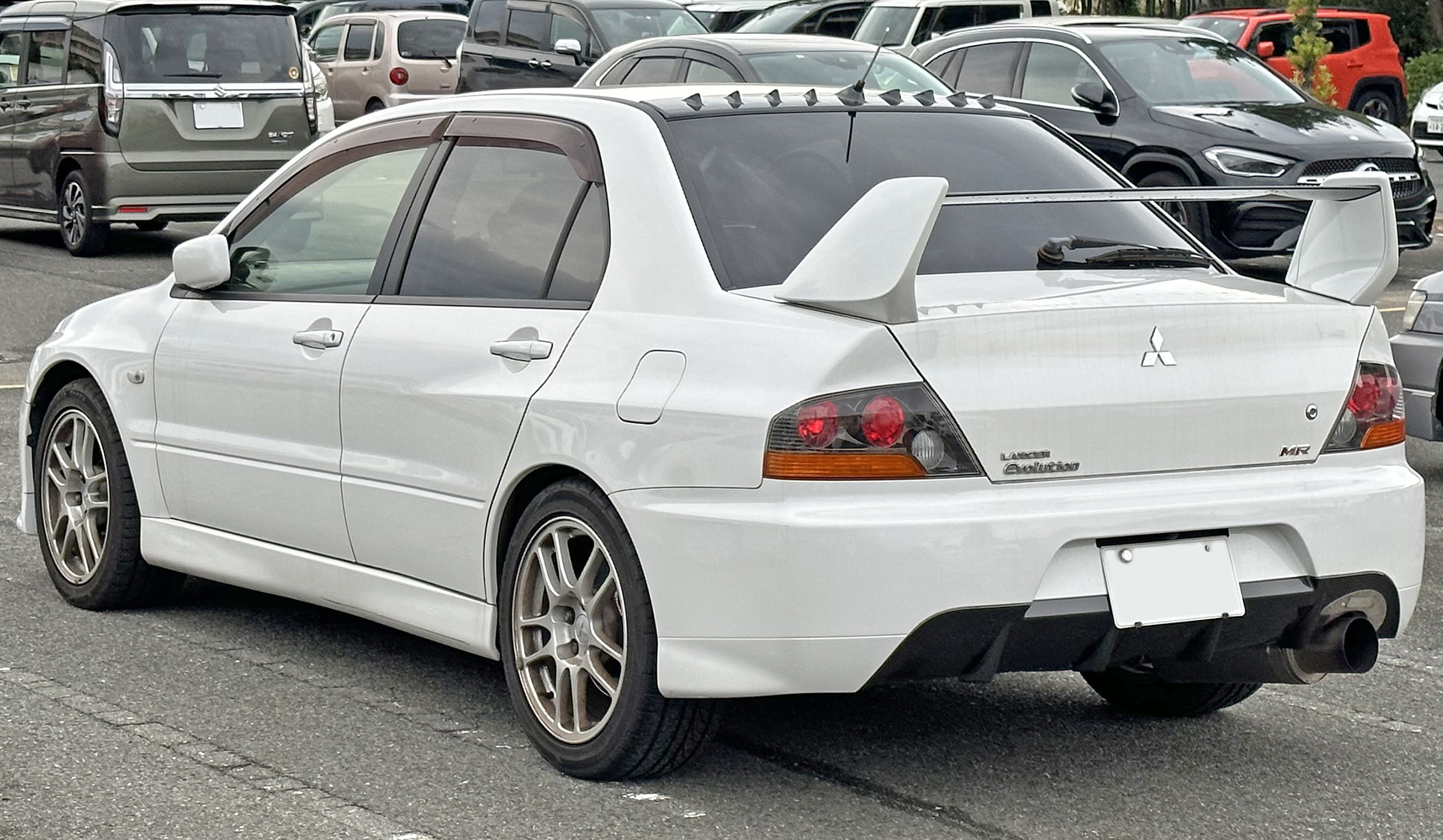
Rear

The USDM Lancer Evolution IX models: standard (Grand Sport Rally or "GSR" in some markets), RS (Rally Sport), SE (Special Edition) and MR (Mitsubishi Racing) varied slightly in their performance capabilities. Subtleties unique to each model accounted for variations in acceleration, handling and top speed. The RS excluded features that came standard on the SE and MR models (stereo system, power windows and locks, rear wiper, rear wing, trunk lining and sound insulation). The result is a weight savings of over 60 lb (27 kg). The fuel capacity remains the same as the Evo VIII at 14 U.S. gal (53 L).

Although the RS is the lightest of the group, the RS did not manage to outperform the standard IX and the MR around a road course (even if only by fractions of a second). This was purported to be due to the lack of a rear wing on the RS. In a drag race, the three models are all about even. They are all capable of 0-60 mph (97 km/h) times between 4.2 and 4.5 seconds, and can run 1/4 mile (402 m) times ranging from 12.6 to 13.3 (12.7–13.0 USA versions) seconds depending on the model/driver. The RS model was produced for rally and racing teams who wanted a platform to build a race car from. It is stripped of all the creature comforts, and other upgrades that drive the price up for features that the race teams would not require.

The IX MR retained the features of the Evolution VIII MR, like Bilstein shocks, a 6-speed manual transmission, a rooftop vortex generator, BBS forged wheels, HID xenon headlights, foglights, accessory gauge package, "zero lift" kit, special badging and an aluminum roof. All models continued to sport Recaro bucket seats, Brembo brakes and Momo steering wheels as well. Additional revisions from 2005 included a closer gear ratio for the 5-speed manual transmission, new lighter Enkei wheels on non-MR models, a redesigned front end with a more efficient air dam (the most noticeable feature are the two small oval ducts to cool the intercooler pipes), and a new rear bumper with a diffuser undersurface to smooth out the airflow coming out of the car for non-US models. HID headlights were no longer standard equipment on the base IX (nor were they standard on the 2005 VIII), and were available only in the SSL package (Sun, Sound, and Leather), SE (Special Edition) and MR trims.

The US versions of the Lancer Evolution IX did not come with the AYC but the ACD was still present. The drivers can select from three different driving modes, "Tarmac", "Gravel" and "Snow", and the car's computer system relatively promotes the active center differential to change the differential locking. Each setting determines how long the ACD will delay in freeing the center differential after a steering input is made. In addition, it will determine how much locking force the ACD will exhibit on the clutch pack and center differential. When the clutch is not fully engaged, torque split cannot be 50/50.

Tarmac is the setting to be used in dry, paved conditions. In this setting, the ACD will almost immediately allow the center differential to go into a free state upon detecting a steering input. Additionally, this mode provides the strongest limited-slip clamping force of the three modes. Although the US versions did not come with the AYC, it did come with a rear 1.5-way clutch type LSD (limited-slip differential), which limits the slip from both rear wheels causing less traction loss of the rear wheels. The most common setup is the 1.5-way LSD, locking on throttle and partially locking on braking. In racing, Lancer Evolutions are not equipped with AYC or ACD because it is believed that better lap times are achieved by pure driver skill without any computer-based assistance systems.

One of the changes from the previous iteration of the Lancer Evolution was the change in the engine. The new 4G63 engine came with MIVEC, Mitsubishi's variable valve timing technology, which drastically improves the fuel consumption by changing the valve timing on the intake camshaft. The MIVEC system is similar to Honda's i-VTEC system only that it doesn't change valve lift, only intake valve timing.

Three trims were available for Japan, Asia, and Europe. Although all models used the same 291 PS (214 kW; 287 hp) engine, the torque differed between models. In Japan, the Evolution IX was advertised to have 280 PS (206 kW; 276 hp) as per the gentlemen's agreement amongst Japanese car manufacturers. The GSR produces 400 N⋅m (295 lb⋅ft) of torque, while the RS and GT have 407 N⋅m (300 lb⋅ft).

=== Standard models ===
- RS – "rally sport", revised 5-speed, aluminium roof, gauge pack, minimal interior, LSD, and a titanium-magnesium turbine, left hand drive option available.
- GT – revised 5-speed, LSD, titanium-magnesium turbine, and Recaro fabric seat, with some of the GSR's features (mainly interior pieces).
- GSR – 6-speed, Bilstein monotube shocks, auto-air conditioner, Recaro leather with Alcantara bucket seat, aluminium roof, gauge pack, SAYC (Super Active Yaw Control), and double-din radio (this is roughly equivalent to the USDM MR).

=== MR Models (Mitsubishi Racing) ===
- MR GSR – same as GSR with BBS 17-inch alloy wheels, Lowered 10 mm (0.39 in) Bilstein suspension, and MR-colored front lip spoiler.
- MR RS – same as RS with MR-colored front lip spoiler (auto air-conditioner, Recaro leather with Alcantara (material) bucket seat, double-din radio, Bilstein monotube shocks with lowered 10 mm (0.39 in) suspension, and SAYC (Super Active Yaw Control) are available as an option).
- MR Tuned by Ralliart – Taking inspiration from the previous Lancer Evolution VI Tommi Mäkinen Edition, this Japanese Lancer Evolution IX was exclusively tuned by Mitsubishi Ralliart; compared to the Evo IX MR GSR except for a carbon fiber front lip spoiler, Official Ralliart livery, and Ralliart RA04 17-inch black forged aluminum wheels.

In the United Kingdom, the Evolution IX used a different model scheme based on the car's horsepower. There were initially three models available: the FQ-300, FQ-320 and FQ-340 each with around 300, 320 and 340 PS (296, 316 and 335 bhp; 221, 235 and 250 kW), respectively. An FQ-360 model was subsequently released as a successor to the Evolution VIII FQ-400. While the new FQ-360 produced 371 PS (366 hp; 273 kW) at 6,887 rpm (less horsepower than its predecessor), it had more torque at 492 N⋅m (363 lb⋅ft) at 3,200 rpm. All four models were designed to run on super unleaded petrol only. The MR FQ-360 was also released in limited numbers (only 200) in the last year of production.

- FQ-300, 320, 340 – 6-speed, Bilstein monotube shocks, AYC (Active Yaw Control).
- FQ-360 – 6-speed, Bilstein monotube shocks, AYC (Active Yaw Control), Ralliart Sports Meter Kit, carbon front splitter, Speedline alloy wheels.
- MR FQ-360 – New turbo with titanium aluminium alloy turbo fins, Speedline Turini alloy wheels, privacy glass, lowered Eibach coil springs (10 mm (0.39 in) at the front/ 5 mm (0.20 in) at the rear), IX MR interior.

Four models were available in the US. All models used the same 286 bhp (290 PS; 213 kW) engine.

- Standard – revised 5-speed, standard model
- RS – rally sport, revised 5-speed, aluminum roof, gauge pack, minimal interior, also no radio
- SE – Special Edition, aluminum roof/hood, and front fenders, split seven-spoke forged aluminum BBS wheels in "diamond black" finish, HID headlights with integrated fog lights, red-stitched Recaro seats
- MR – 6-speed, Bilstein monotube shocks, split seven-spoke forged aluminum BBS wheels, aluminum roof, hood, and front fenders, gauge pack, HID headlights with integrated fog lights, vortex generator, front brake cooling ducts and custom MR badging.

All of the American models are the same in power, but may differ in performance. The only thing that sets them apart is the Evo RS, which is 80 lb (36 kg) lighter than the MR and SE models.

To the standard model, the Sun, Sound and Leather (SSL) package added a power sunroof, HID xenon headlamps with integrated fog lights, a slightly different stereo head unit (with no integral amplifier), slightly upgraded speakers in the front doors and parcel shelf, a 4.1-channel amplifier under the driver's seat, a powered, trunk-mounted Infinity subwoofer, black leather seating surfaces, leather-trimmed door panels, slightly revised center armrests in the front and rear, and separate rear side headrests. This model deleted the GSR's headliner-mounted sunglass holder to make room for the sunroof.

The Philippines had the Evolution IX until in August 2008, which was offered in two trims, the entry-level RS offering a 5-speed manual transmission, Brembo 17-inch ventilated discs (4-Pot), Brembo 16-inch ventilated drum-in-disc (2-Pot) and almost the same features as to that of the GSR trim in the international version. Some RS models had the SAYC option, while some did not. The MR was the top-of-the-line segment, which offered almost the same features as to that of the MR trim in the international version. All of them are powered by the same 2.0 L (1,997 cc) 4G63 turbocharged MIVEC inline-four engine.

=== Evolution Wagon ===
Evolution Wagon
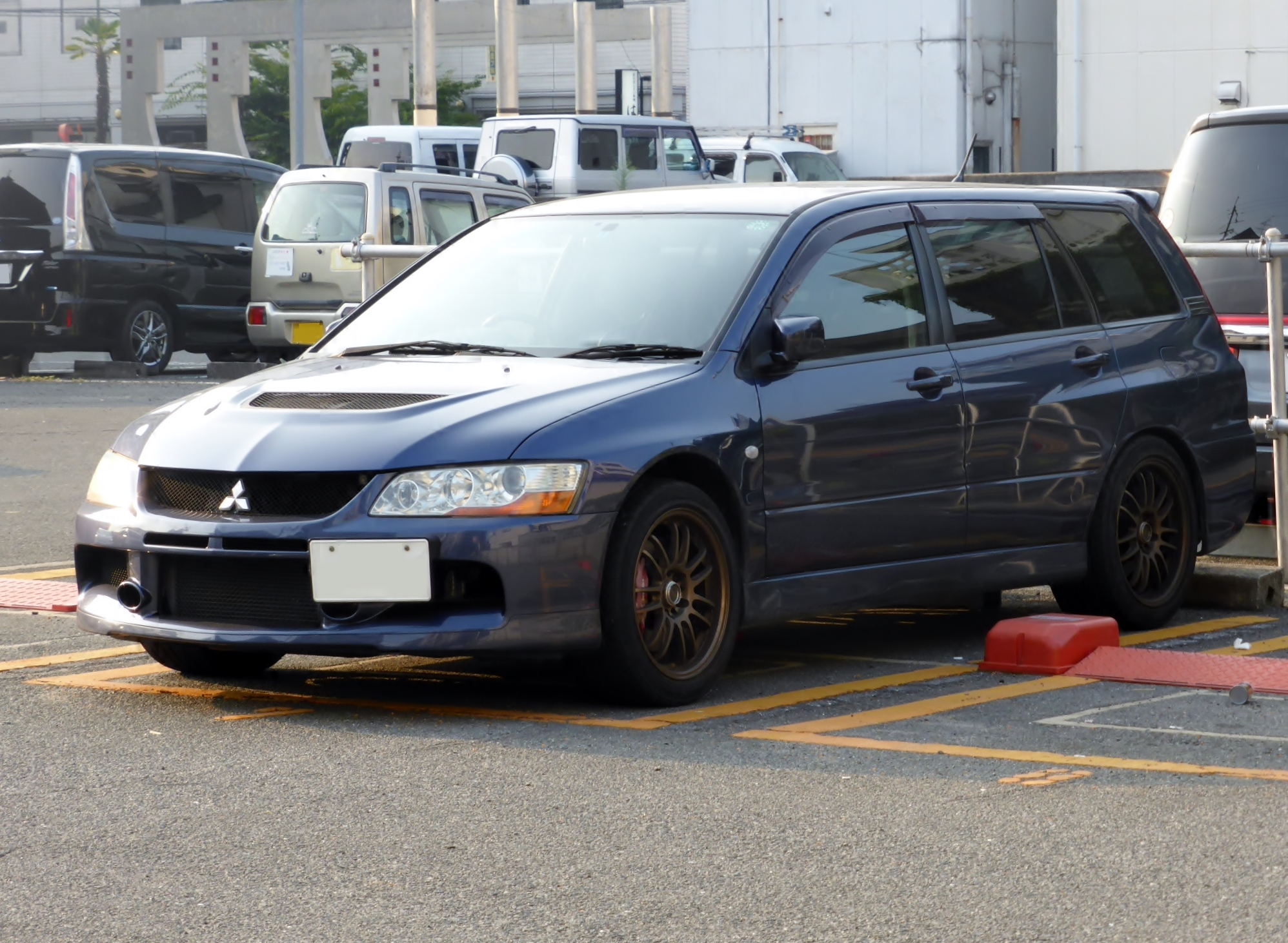

Overview
- Production: August 2005 – November 2006

Body and chassis
- Platform: CT9W

Powertrain
- Engine: 1997 cc 4G63T MIVEC turbo I4
- Power output: Manual: 206kW @ 6500rpm and 392Nm @ 3000; Automatic: 200kW @ 6500 and 343 Nm @ 3000
- Transmission: 6-speed manual; 5-Speed INVECS-II automatic

Dimensions
- Wheelbase: 2,625 mm (103.3 in)
- Length: 4,520–4,530 mm (178.0–178.3 in)
- Width: 1,770 mm (69.7 in)
- Height: 1,480 mm (58.3 in)
- Curb weight: 1,500–1,540 kg (3,307–3,395 lb)

Chronology
- Successor: Mitsubishi Lancer Sportback Ralliart

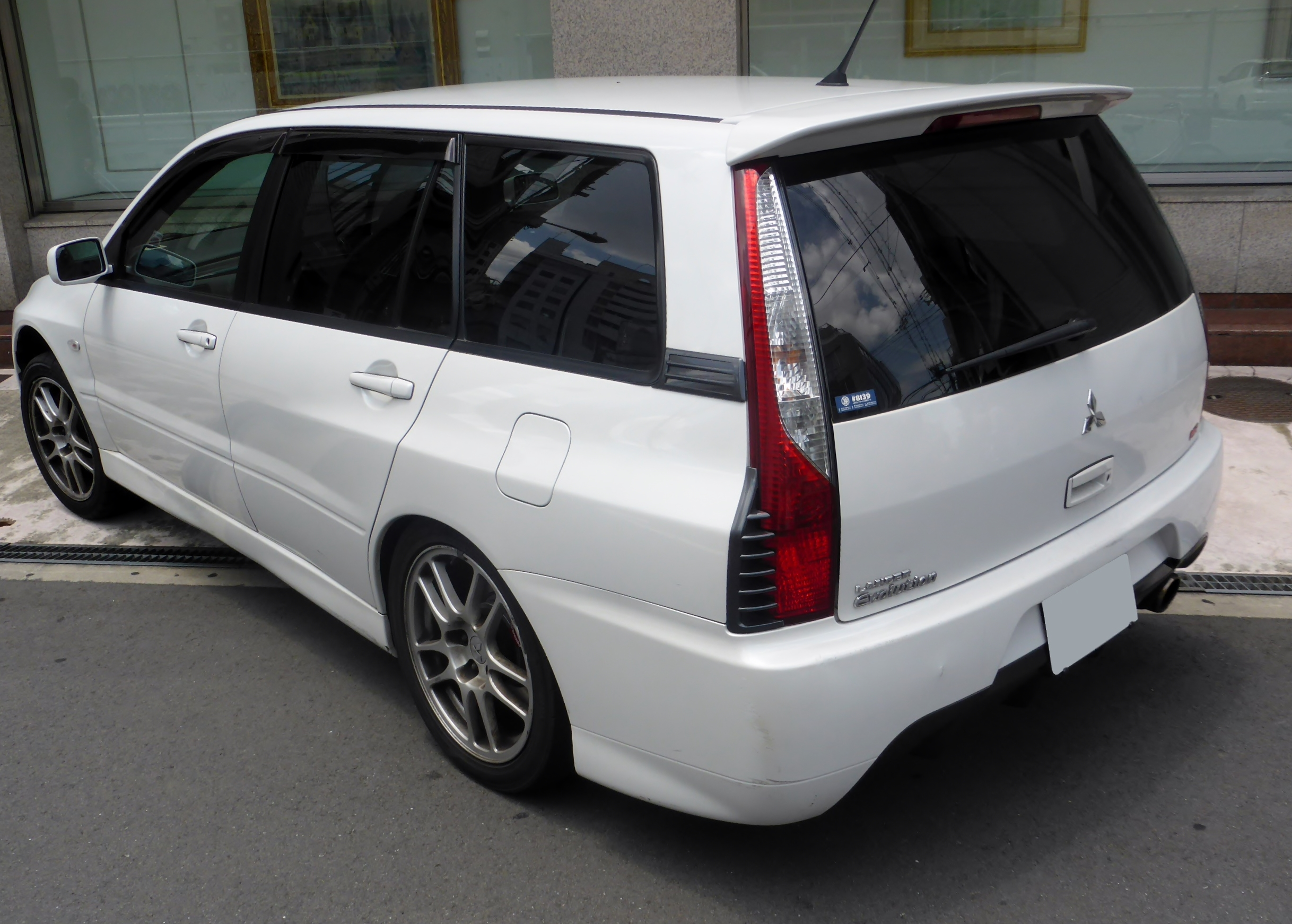
Mitsubishi Lancer Evolution Wagon GT-A (rear)

Mitsubishi also released an Evolution Wagon in two variations, the GT (Grand Touring) and GT-A (Grand Touring - Automatic). The 'Evo Wagon' is also commonly referred to as the 'Evo IX Wagon', although Mitsubishi never specifically referred to it as an Evo IX in promotional or dealership-related material. For the 2005 production year, these models are considered as the 'base specification', whilst all vehicles produced in 2006 were the special MR (Mitsubishi Racing) specification.

Mitsubishi offered 4 manufacturer options, which can be located on the VIN plate: 000 - No additional options; 100 - Cold Specification; P00 - BBS wheels; T00 - Combination of Cold Specification and BBS wheels.

Cold specification could include: uprated battery, weatherstrip silicon coating, rear seat heater duct, heated door mirrors, rear wiper changed from resin to steel and an additional air duct for the GT-A. Further dealer options and Ralliart options could be fitted, including Rays CE28 wheels or Bilstein coilovers.

The Evo Wagon GT is the closest variant to its Evolution IX sedan sibling due to being fitted with the MIVEC 4G63 engine and accompanying TD05-16G-10.5 turbo. The GT-A was a parts bin special, it is very loosely based on an Evolution VIII 4G63 engine, it is considered to have the later and stronger CT9A rotating assembly, Evo VII block and Evo VIII (non-MR) head. Due to the late production of the wagon, specifically the MR models, some vehicles may have been fitted with an Evo IX block. The GT-A also inherited the TD05-16G-9.0 turbo from its Evo VII GT-A cousin which is considerably smaller than the other CT9A counterparts. The GT-A is also fitted with a revised W5A5A transmission.

All wagons came fitted with an Active Centre Differential (ACD) and received the rear 1.5-way mechanical LSD as found on the RS sedans. In addition, the GT wagons were fitted with the front 1-way helical LSD as found on the JDM GSR sedans.

The vehicle was sold as a Japanese Domestic vehicle only and later available for import to other countries as grey imports.

VIN Searching on epic-data.com has shown there was a total of 2,915 Lancer Evolution Wagons. This includes all GT, GT MR, GT-A & GT-A MR versions even though Mitsubishi's 2005 Press Release said they intended to make 2,500 Evolution Wagons.

Build breakdown:

- Base specification total - 2609. GT: 1244; GT-A 1365. Includes 39 pre-production/prototype vehicles.
- MR specification total - 306. GT: 152; GT-A 154. Includes 6 pre-production/prototype vehicles.
- Manual Evolution Wagons total - 1396.
- Automatic Evolution Wagons total - 1519.

Colour options for the base specification include: Cool Silver Metallic (A31D), Deep Blue Mica (T65D), Black Mica (X42D) and an optional White Pearl (W13D).

Colour options for the MR include: Medium Purplish Gray Mica (A39D), Cool Silver Metallic (A31D), Red Solid (P23D) and an optional White Pearl (W13D).

Whilst there are Red Solid base spec wagons in the wild (assumingly with the P23D paint code), these were not a factory colour choice, however they have production series VINs, only 10 of these were made. There are pre-production/prototype base specification wagons with the paint code W37D, only 8 of these exist.

Pricing when new (MSRP):

- Base Specification: GT - ¥3,465,000; GT-A - ¥3,412,500
- MR Specification: GT - ¥3,486,000; GT-A - ¥3,412,500

Compared to the Evo IX sedan, the Evolution Wagon received a front seat that had lower bolsters for easier entry and exit of the vehicle. These less sporty seats were the OEM standard seats in the Australian-delivered Evo IX sedan.

== Evolution X ==
Tenth generation
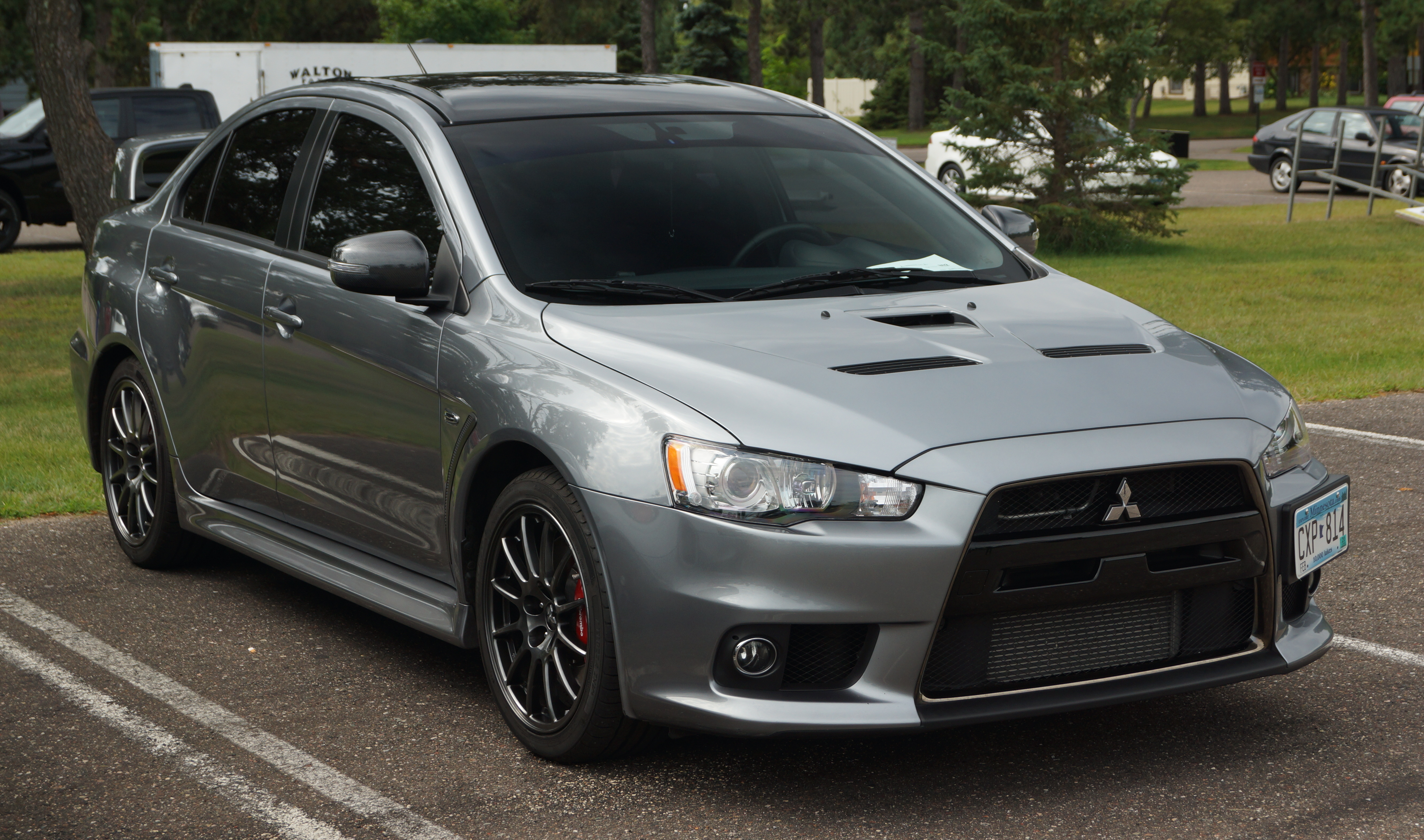

Overview
- Production: October 2007 – May 2016
- Designer: Omer Halilhodžić

Body and chassis
- Platform: CZ4A
- Related: Mitsubishi Lancer (ninth generation)

Powertrain
- Engine: 1998 cc 4B11T MIVEC turbo I4
- Power output: 295 PS (291 bhp; 217 kW) and 407 N⋅m (300 lbf⋅ft) of torque
- Transmission: 6-speed twin-clutch transmission (TC-SST); 5-speed manual

Dimensions
- Wheelbase: 2,650 mm (104.3 in)
- Length: 4,495 mm (177.0 in)
- Width: 1,810 mm (71.3 in)
- Height: 1,480 mm (58.3 in)
- Curb weight: 1,420–1,600 kg (3,131–3,527 lb)

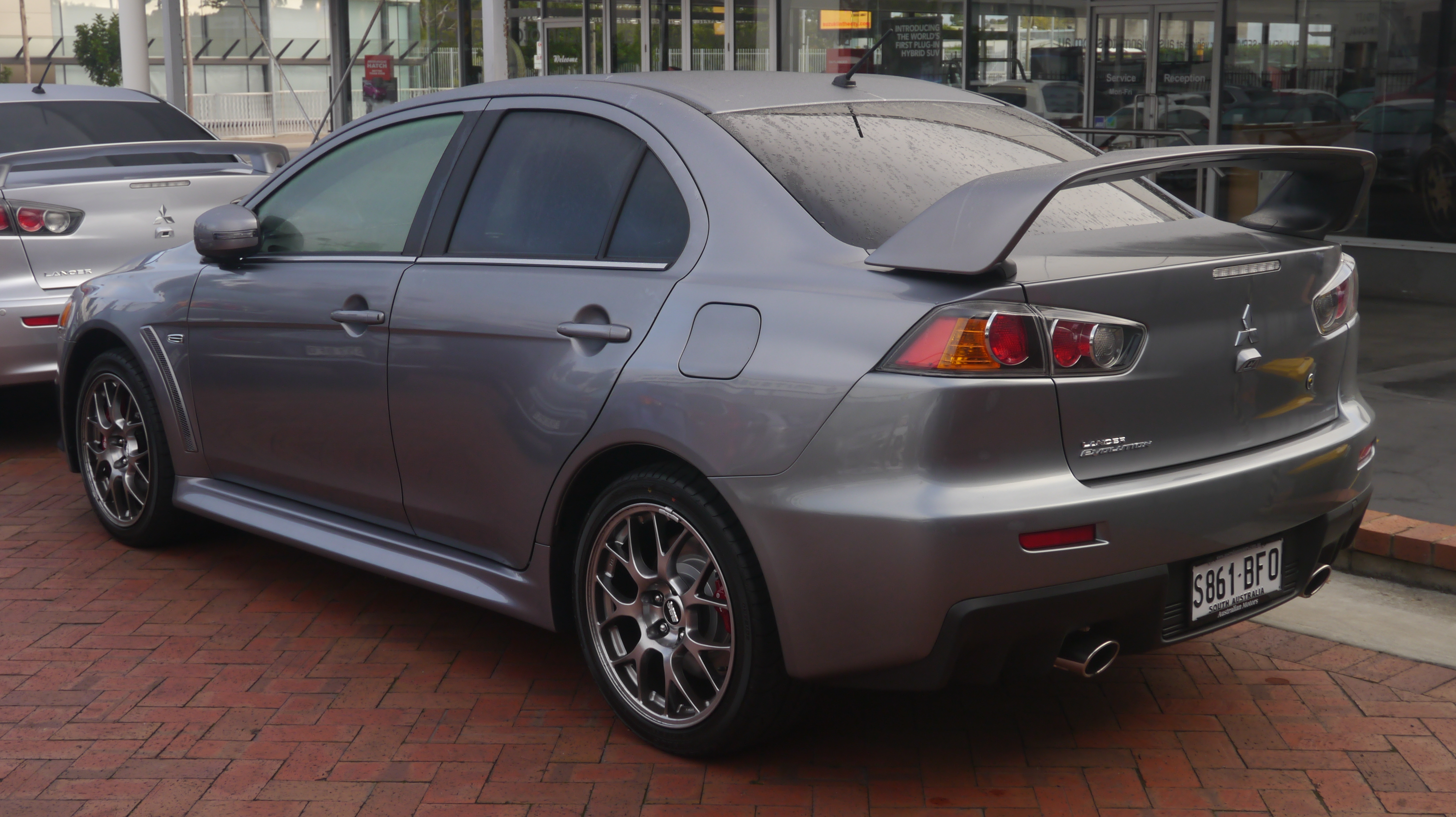
Rear

In 2005, Mitsubishi introduced a concept version of the next-gen Evolution at the 39th Tokyo Motor Show named the Concept-X, designed by Omer Halilhodžić at the company's European design centre. Mitsubishi unveiled a second concept car, the Prototype-X, at the 2007 North American International Auto Show (NAIAS).

The Lancer Evolution X sedan features a newly designed 4B11T 1,998 cc (2.0 L) turbocharged, all-aluminium alloy GEMA Inline-four engine. Power and torque depend on the market, but all versions will have at least 280 PS (206 kW; 276 hp). (JDM version), the American market version will have slightly more. The UK models were reworked by Mitsubishi UK, in accordance with previous MR Evolutions bearing the FQ badge. Options for the UK Evolutions were expected to be between 300 hp (224 kW) and 360 hp (268 kW).

Two versions of the car are offered in the U.S. The Lancer Evolution MR, with 6-speed Twin-Clutch Sportronic Shift Transmission (TC-SST). The other version is the GSR which has a 5-speed manual transmission system. The car also has a new full-time four-wheel-drive system named S-AWC (Super All Wheel Control), an advanced version of Mitsubishi's AWC system used in previous generations. The S-AWC uses torque vectoring technology to send different amounts of torque to the rear wheels.

It also features Mitsubishi's new 6-speed SST dual-clutch automatic transmission with steering-mounted magnesium alloy shift paddles. It has replaced the Tiptronic automatic transmission, hence the SST version replaced the GT-A version (which was used in Evolution VII and Evolution IX Wagon). A five-speed manual gearbox will also be available. The new Lancer Evolution will also incorporate Mitsubishi's next-generation RISE safety body.

The Evolution X went on sale October 1, 2007 in Japan, New Zealand & some in Australia. 2007 models are rare as they were only sold in these countries. January 2008 in the US, February in Canada (as the first version of Evolution in Canada) and in March 2008 in the UK. The Twin Clutch SST version was available in Japan from November 2007. Europe will follow with sales in May, GSR and MR version included premium Package. The introduction of the 2010 MR-Touring moved the car even further upscale. Leather and a sunroof became standard while revising the rear spoiler to just a lip spoiler. For the police car, the British Police decided to use these Mitsubishi Lancer Evolution Xs as police cars, and the Royal Malaysia Police (Polis Diraja Malaysia) also use Mitsubishi Lancer Evolution X as the Police Highway Eagle (Helang Lebuhraya Polis) patrol team. These patrol car fleet will probably be used by Highway Pursuit / Patrol or VIP Escort.

In 2014, it was revealed that Mitsubishi would discontinue production of the Mitsubishi Lancer Evolution after the 2015 model year. The company expressed a desire to refocus its efforts on crossover vehicles and electric vehicles.

== Motorsports ==
=== Rally ===
The Lancer Evolution is unique among its competitors in the World Rally Championship (WRC) in that it was a homologated Group A car slightly modified to be able to race competitively against the then newly formed World Rally Car regulations from the 1997 season. Mitsubishi continued to adhere to Group A regulations until the San Remo Rally in 2001, World Rally Car class cars. Lancer Evolutions were successful in WRC Rallies from 1996 to 1999, mostly in the hands of Finnish driver Tommi Mäkinen, clinching driver's titles in four-consecutive seasons from 1996 to 1999 (in Evolutions III, IV, V, and VI), and with the help of teammate Richard Burns in clinching the constructors' championship for the first, and thus far only time in 1998. The Evolution however was replaced in late 2001 by the firm's first World Rally Car, named simply the Lancer Evolution WRC (based on the Lancer Cedia rather than the Evolution VII), which was driven by Mäkinen, Freddy Loix, Alister McRae and François Delecour with relatively limited success, until Mitsubishi took a sabbatical from the championship at the end of 2002. It was succeeded for the 2004 Monte Carlo Rally by the Lancer WRC04. Mitsubishi pulled out of the World Rally Championship after the 2005 season with the Lancer WRC05 still being driven by privateers including Italian former works driver Gigi Galli and Sweden's Daniel Carlsson, in the years following.

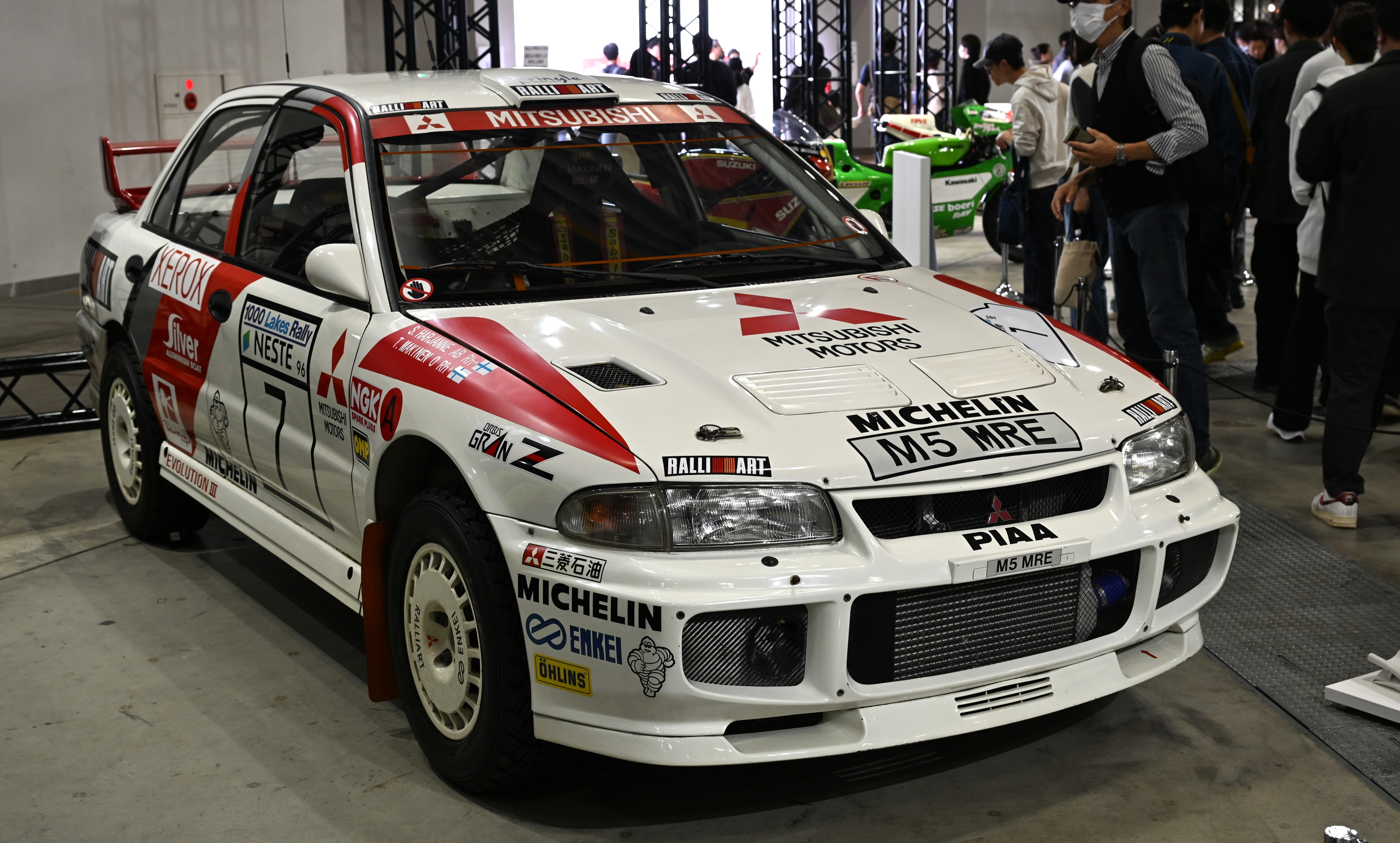
Tommi Mäkinen's Lancer Evolution III

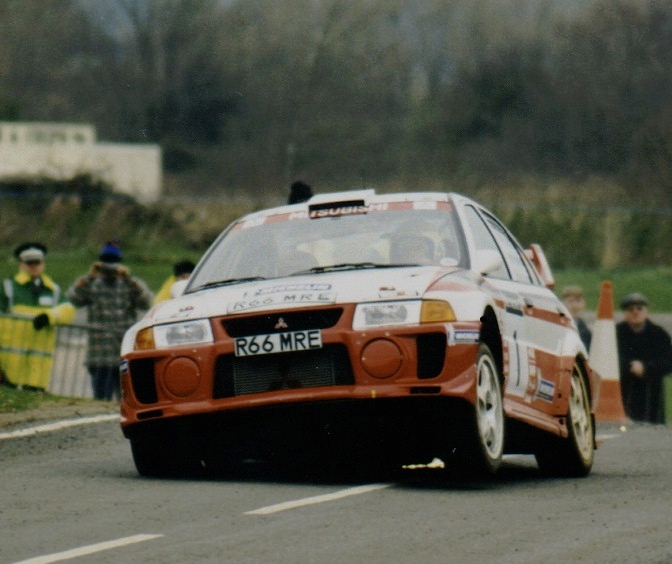
Tommi Mäkinen's Lancer Evolution V

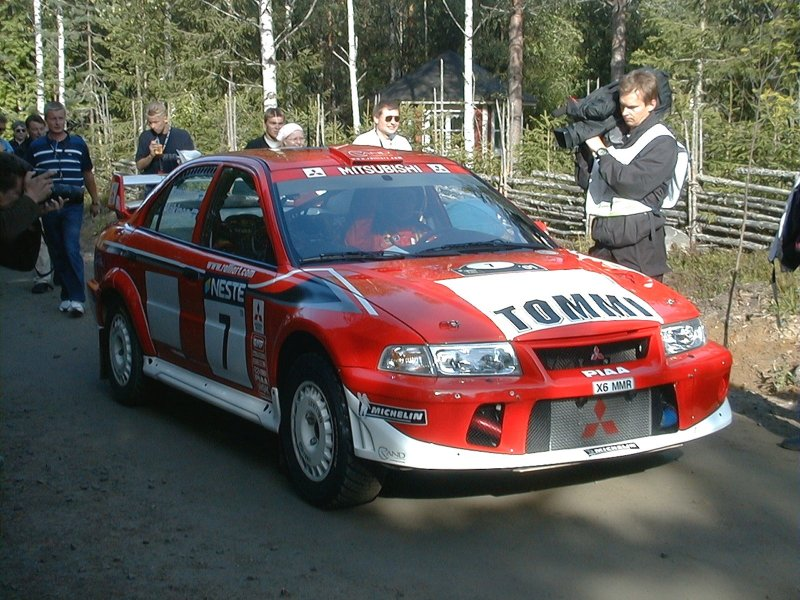
Tommi Mäkinen's Lancer Evolution 6.5

The Lancer Evolution was also highly successful in the WRC Group N category, dominating the championship from 1995 to 2000. When the category gained world championship status and was rebranded as the Production World Rally Championship (PWRC) in 2002, the Lancer Evolution initially struggled against its arch-rival, the Subaru Impreza WRX STI. However, it went on to win four titles (2008, 2009, 2010, and 2012) in the PWRC's final five seasons with the Evolution IX and X before the category was replaced by the Group R-based WRC2 in 2013. Note: PWRC was officially replaced by WRC3, while the SWRC was the actual predecessor of WRC2. However, all WRC3 cars were 2WD cars based on the R1–R3 classes, while the Lancer Evolution IX and X were classified as R4 cars and allowed to compete in WRC2 until 2018.

In addition to winning in the WRC, the Lancer Evolution has also successfully won several titles in regional championships such as the Asia-Pacific Rally Championship (APRC) and the Mitropa Rally Cup. It has also won numerous national championships, including the All Japan Rally Championship (ja), the Finnish Rally Championship, the British Rally Championship, the German Rally Championship and the Australian Rally Championship.

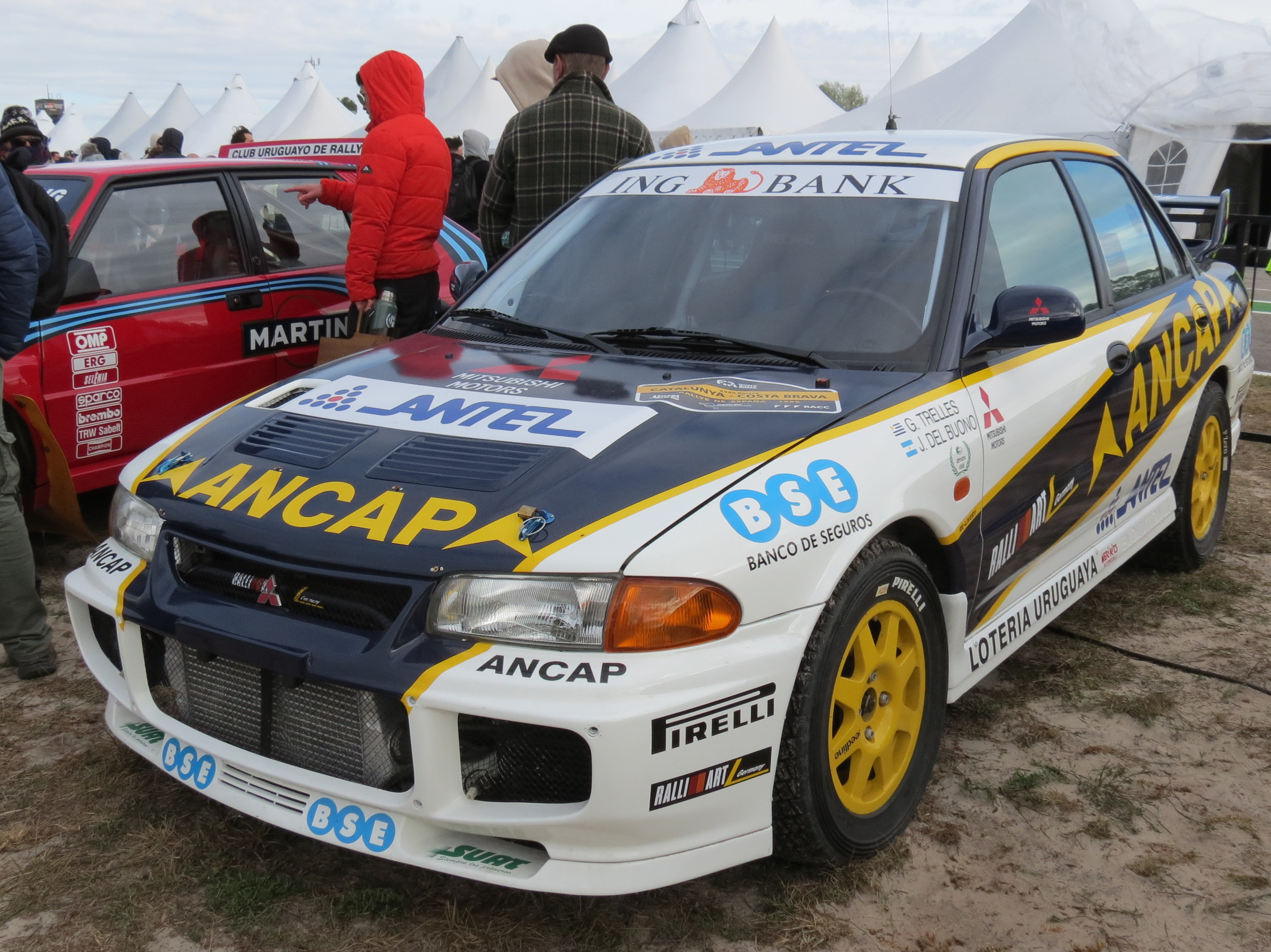
Gustavo Trelles' 1996 and 1997 WRC Group N-winning Lancer Evolution III

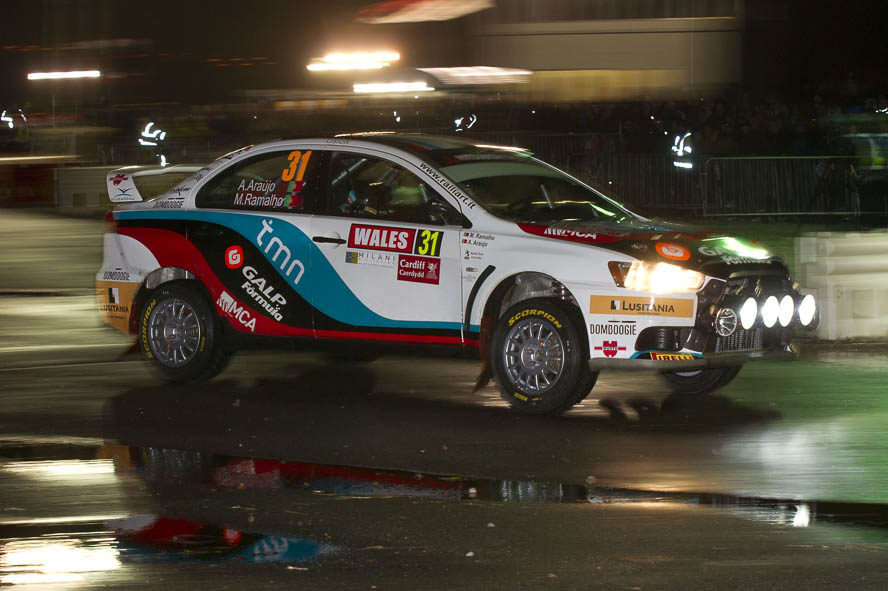
Armindo Araújo's 2010 PWRC-winning Lancer Evolution X

As the Lancer was not available in most European markets in the late 1990s, where the Carisma was sold instead, the works WRC team's second car from 1997 to 2001 (usually driven by Burns between 1997 and 1998 and subsequently Loix until 2001) was customarily entered as a Carisma GT. The 1998 season brought the best results for the Carisma GT, with Burns winning two events at the Safari Rally and the Rally Great Britain. The Carisma GT also won five consecutive Group N titles in the Finnish Rally Championship between 1997 and 2001.

Proton of Malaysia raced the Lancer Evolution II and III under the Proton Wira 4WD Turbo name (Proton Wira itself was based on the Lancer), winning the Group N class of the 1997 APRC. The Lancer Evolution series was later rebranded as Proton PERT starting with the Evolution V and eventually finding huge success by winning the 2001 and 2002 APRC and the 2002 PWRC with the Evolution VI-based PERT "Mk1". Proton later switched to the Evolution VII-based PERT "Mk2" and won the 2004 APRC title. All of Proton's titles were won by Malaysian driver Karamjit Singh and navigator Allen Oh.

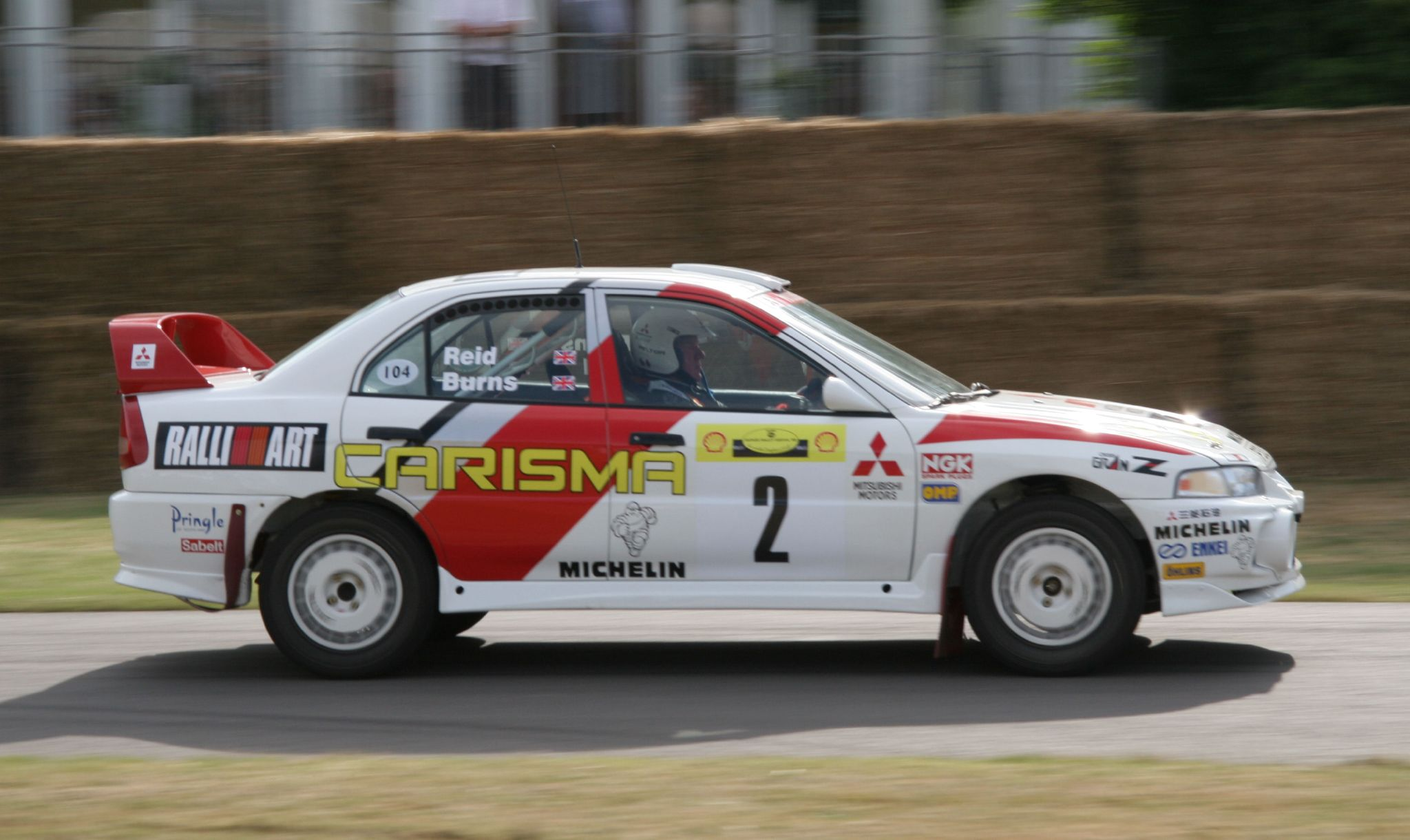
Richard Burns' Carisma GT Evolution IV at the 2006 Goodwood Festival of Speed

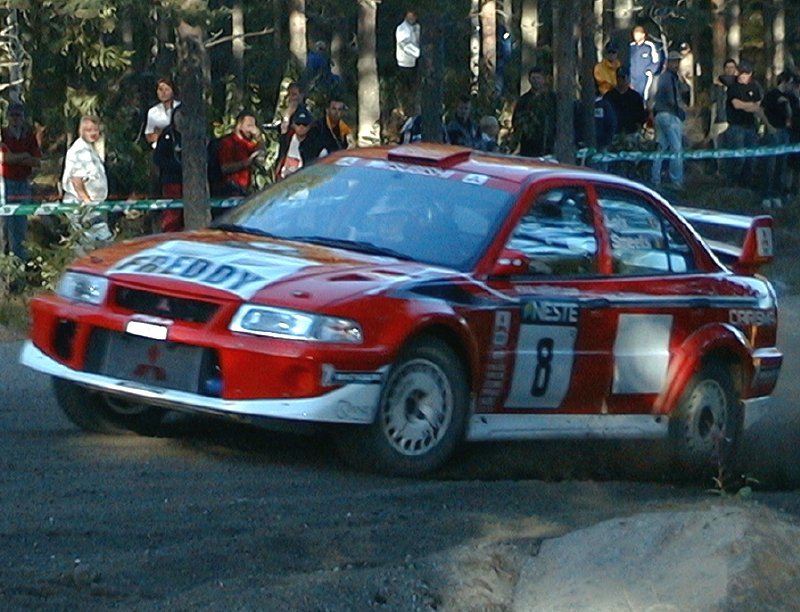
Freddy Loix's Carisma GT Evolution 6.5

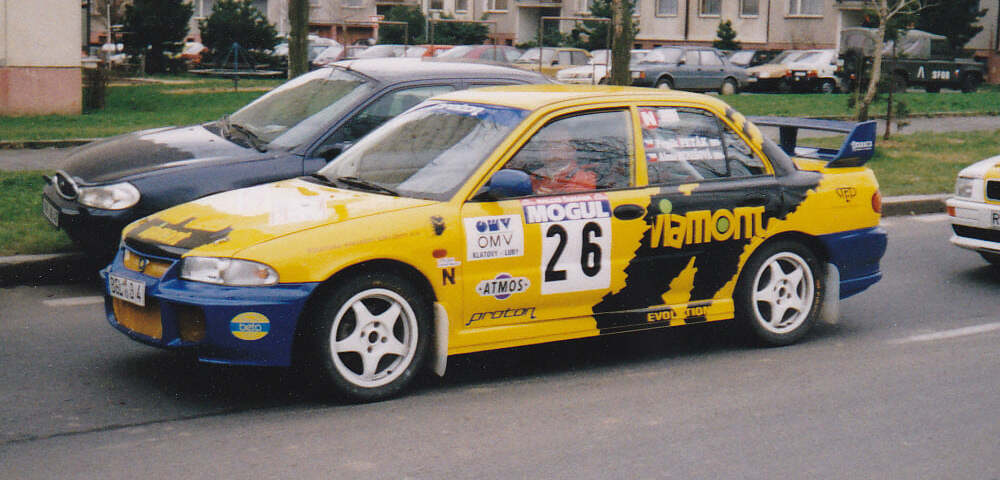
Proton Wira 4WD Turbo Evolution III at the 1998 ERC Rally Šumava

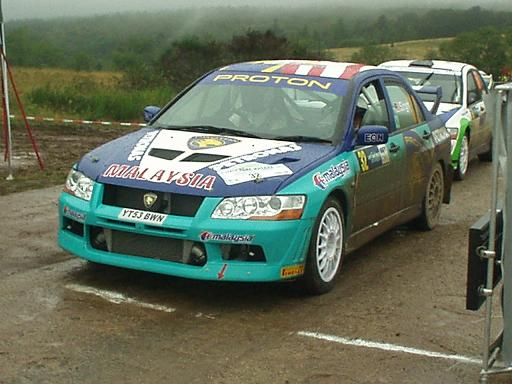
Karamjit Singh's Proton PERT "Mk2" Evolution VII

Beyond standard rally racing, the Lancer Evolution was also popular in rallycross championships. The most notable result was four European Rallycross Championship titles in Divisions 1 and 2, won by Norwegian rallycross driver Eivind Opland (fr) between 1995 and 1998.

In the All Japan Dirt Trial Championship (similar to a rally super special stage, where drivers compete individually to achieve the fastest time), the Lancer Evolution has won at least one class every year since 1993, with the exception of 1998 and 2000.

=== Track racing ===
The Lancer Evolution has been highly successful in various Australian circuit racing championships. It won the 2000 Australian GT Production Car Championship, three Australian Performance Car Championship titles (2003, 2006, and 2007), four consecutive Australian Production Car Championship titles (2010 to 2013), two Bathurst 12 Hour titles (2008 and 2009), two Australian Endurance Championship titles (2011 and 2012), and two Class A1 Bathurst 6 Hour titles (2023 and 2026).

In the Super Taikyu Series, the Lancer Evolution dominated the Class 2 championship category, which was later redesignated as ST-2 in 2005. Initially, the car was placed in Class 1 due to its turbocharged engine, forcing it to compete against larger-engined cars like the GTO Twin Turbo, Toyota Supra Turbo, and Nissan Skyline GT-R, before finally being moved to Class 2 in 1995. Between 1996 and 2012, the Lancer Evolution secured fifteen championship titles, missing out only in 2002 and 2005. The Lancer Evolution IX Wagon also competed in this series for several races during the 2006 season and a full season in 2007. Its best results came during the latter, with three ST-2 class podium finishes—including an overall second-place finish in the opening race.

Most recently, (2005 to 2006) the CT9A chassis Evolution has been dominant in Time Attack (time trials) throughout the world. CyberEvo's CT9A chassis Lancer Evolution (now retired) previously held the OEM chassis record at Japan's Tsukuba Circuit for Time Attack, as well as the Australian record at Eastern Creek Raceway. Sierra Sierra Enterprise's CT9A chassis Evolution holds the U.S. Time Attack record. The Tilton Interiors CT9A chassis Lancer Evolution held the time attack record at Sydney Motorsport Park until October 2016 where MCA "Hammerhead" Nissan Silvia reset the record.

Silhouette racing cars resembling the Lancer Evolution VIII—featuring tubular frames, rear-wheel-drive, and V8 engines—were used in Stock Car Brasil between 2005 and 2008, with Cacá Bueno won the series twice in 2006 and 2007.

The rear-wheel-drive-converted Lancer Evolution has also been used by professional drifters in Japan and several other countries, with notable results achieved by Team Orange drivers Nobushige Kumakubo and Naoto Suenaga, who won several rounds in the D1 Grand Prix.

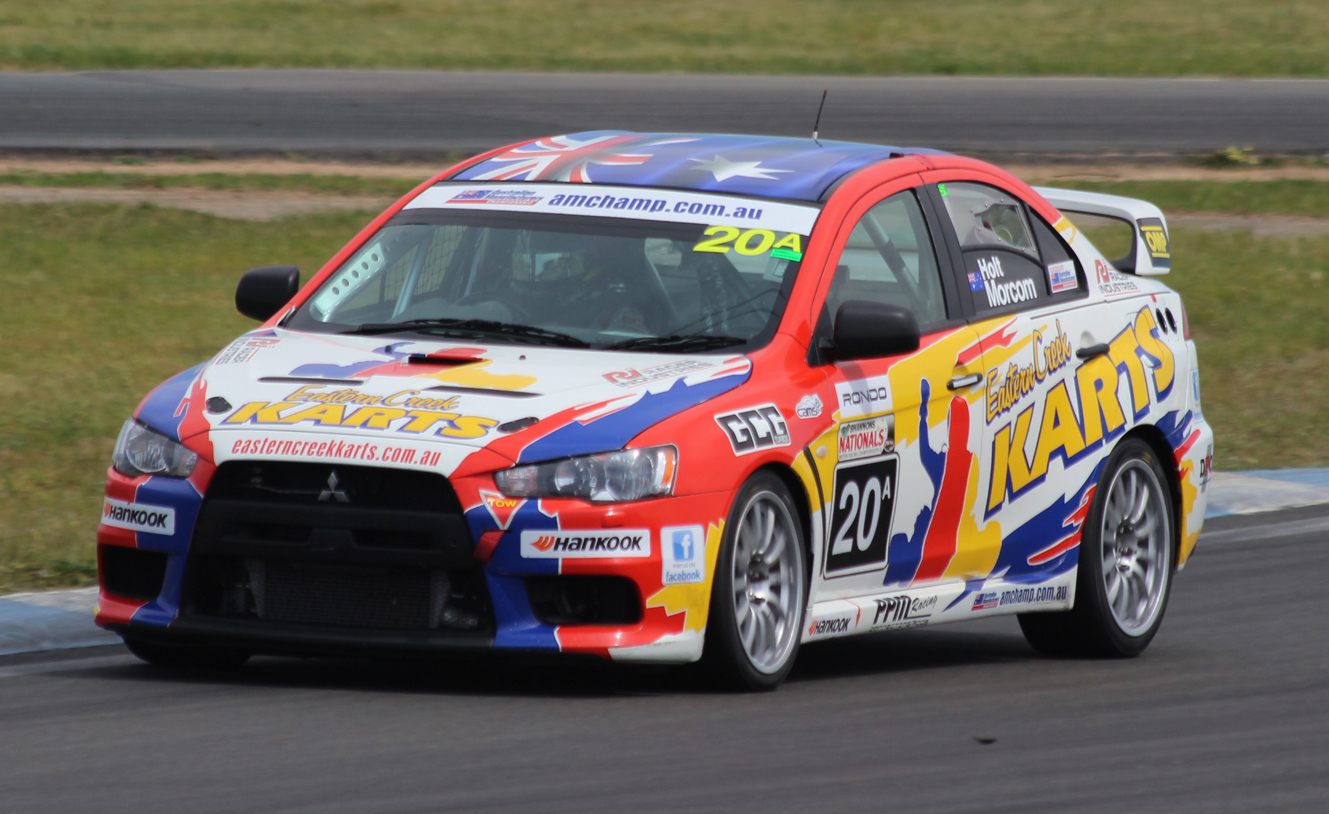
Garry Holt's 2013 Australian Production Car Championship-winning Lancer Evolution X

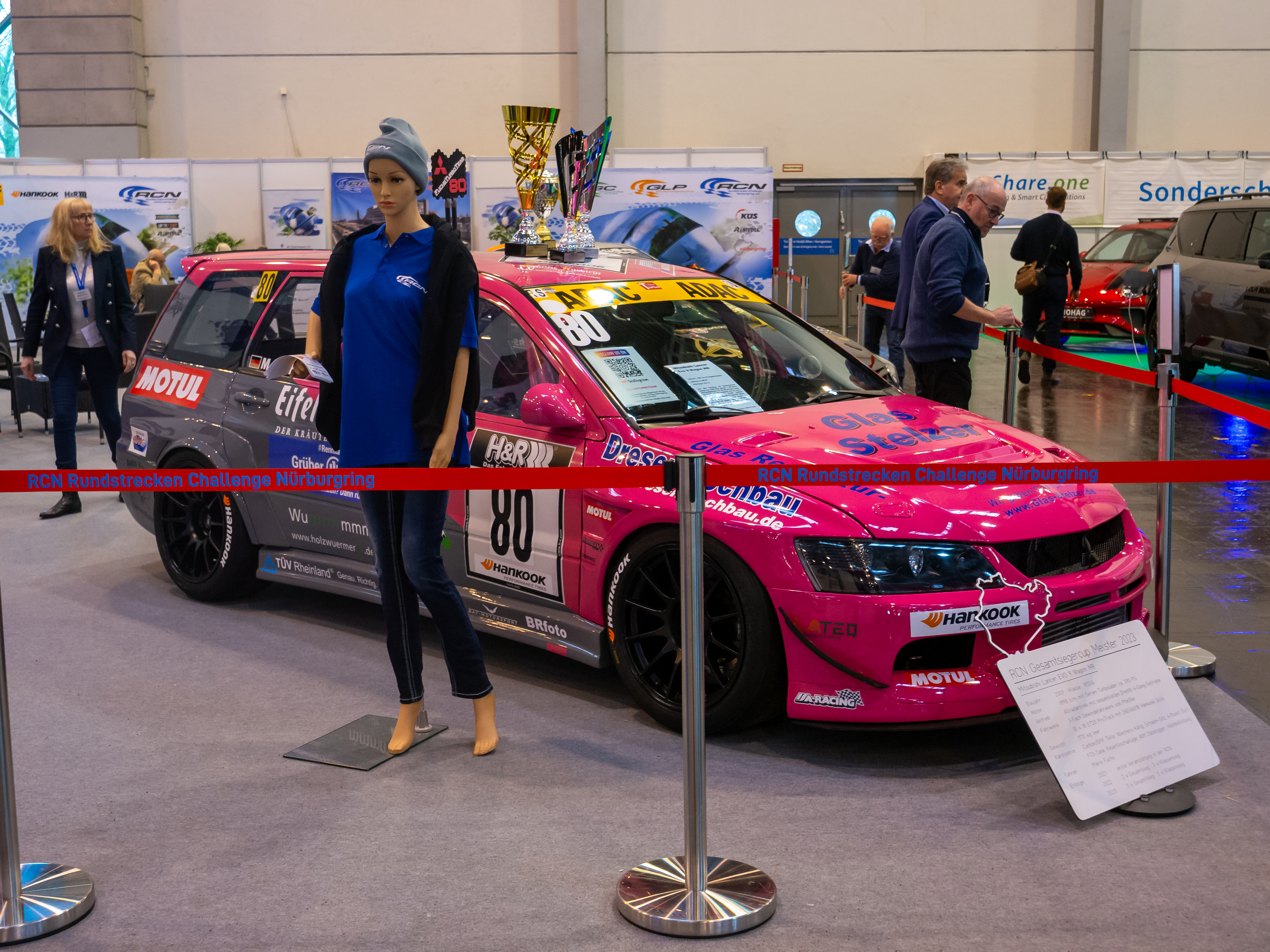
Mario Fuchs' 2023 Rundstrecken Challenge Nürburgring gesamtsieger category-winning Lancer Evolution IX Wagon

=== Hill climbing ===
The Evolution IX won the European Hill Climb Championship 11 times since 2007, with 13 wins also in the FIA International Hill Climb Cup.

== Awards ==
The Mitsubishi Lancer Evolution won Consumer Search's best Aggressive sports sedan in Best Sports Sedans in June 2006. During 2004–2005 alone it won six major awards, being declared "Sports Car of the Year" in Scotland and France, "Playboy Sports Car 2004" in Poland, "Best New Production Car Under €60,000" in Greece, "Sport Compact Car of the Year" in 2004 and 2005 (Sport Compact Car magazine) and "2005 All-Star" (Automobile magazine) in the United States and Motor magazine's Best "Bang for Your Bucks" Australia. Also in 2004, the Lancer Evo was presented with the Editors' Choice Award by Grassroots Motorsports. The Lancer Evolution X was named as the "Best Performance Car under $50K" by Canadian TV show Motoring 2009, and won the Automobile Journalists Association of Canada's 2009 "Best New Technology" award. It was also nominated as one of the top 10 "World Performance Car of the Year", won the Automotive Excellence Awards' 2008 "Fun to Drive" category, and took Dave TV's "Sports Car of the Year" award in 2008.

Awards
Preceded by Subaru Impreza WRC	Autosport; Rally Car of the Year; 1998	Succeeded by Toyota Corolla WRC
