= Mitsubishi Concept-ZT =

Concept car

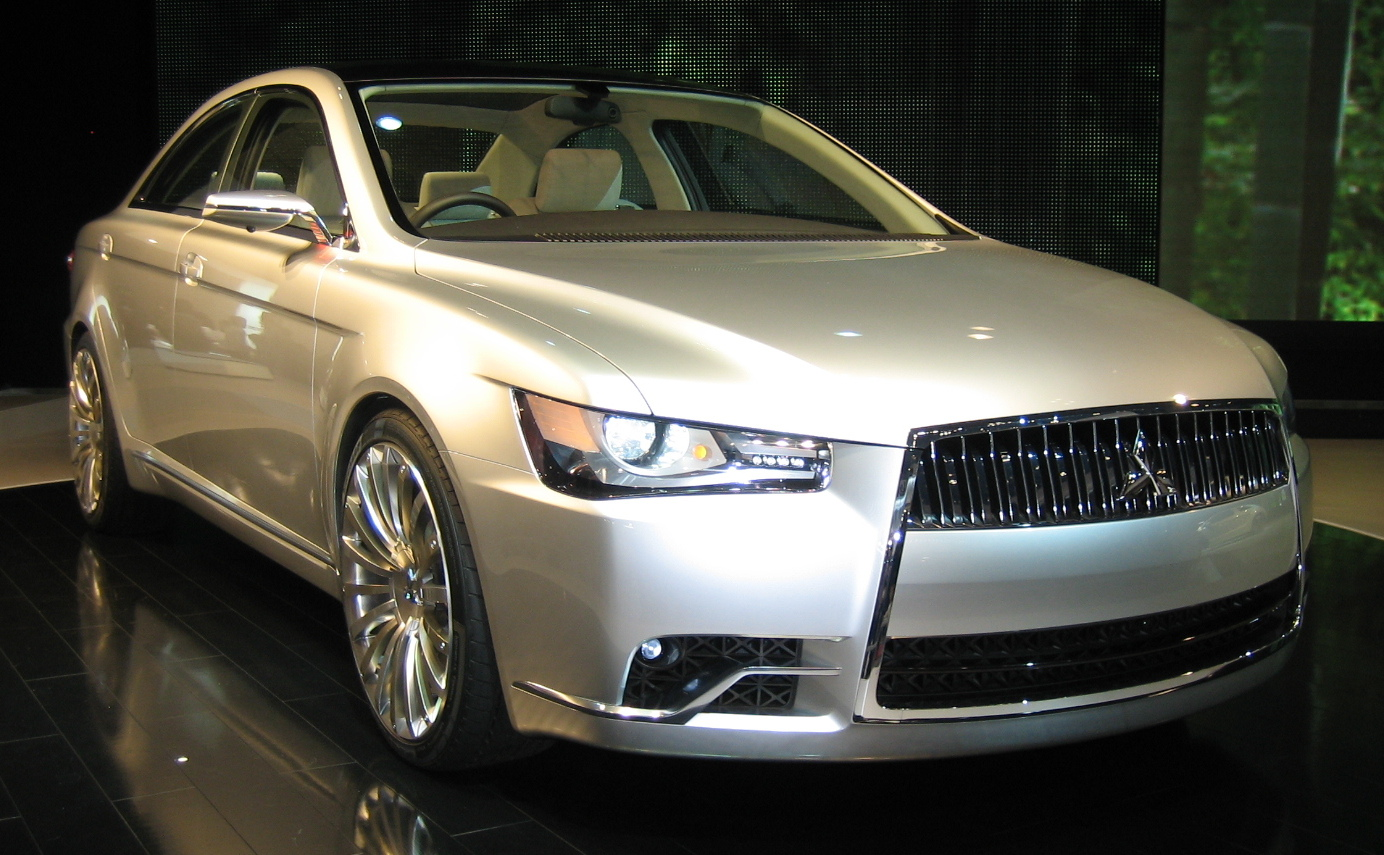

Overview
- Manufacturer: Mitsubishi Motors
- Production: 2007

Body and chassis
- Class: Compact car Concept car
- Layout: Front engine, four-wheel drive

Powertrain
- Engine: 4N14 2.2 L I4 turbodiesel
- Transmission: SST twin-clutch transmission

Dimensions
- Wheelbase: 2,815 mm (110.8 in)
- Length: 4,950 mm (194.9 in)
- Width: 1,820 mm (71.7 in)
- Height: 1,440 mm (56.7 in)

The Mitsubishi Concept-ZT is a concept car developed by Japanese automaker Mitsubishi Motors, and first exhibited at the 40th Tokyo Motor Show in September 2007.

The car has an aluminium space frame chassis, and features a 4N14 2.2-litre clean diesel producing 140 kW (190 PS) and 400 N⋅m (295 lb⋅ft), powering all four wheels through the company's S-AWC drivetrain and SST twin-clutch transmission. Following the lead of other Mitsubishi prototypes at the time, "green plastic" recyclable resin is used extensively in the body panels and interior for environmental reasons.

Although there was initially no official confirmation, the automotive press was confident that this prototype presaged the next generation of the Mitsubishi Galant, and the Galant-based Mitsubishi 380 in Australia. However, in August 2008, the company announced that it had abandoned production plans using the same drivetrain and a steel body, claiming they could no longer make a business case for the car.
