= Mitsubishi Concept-RA =

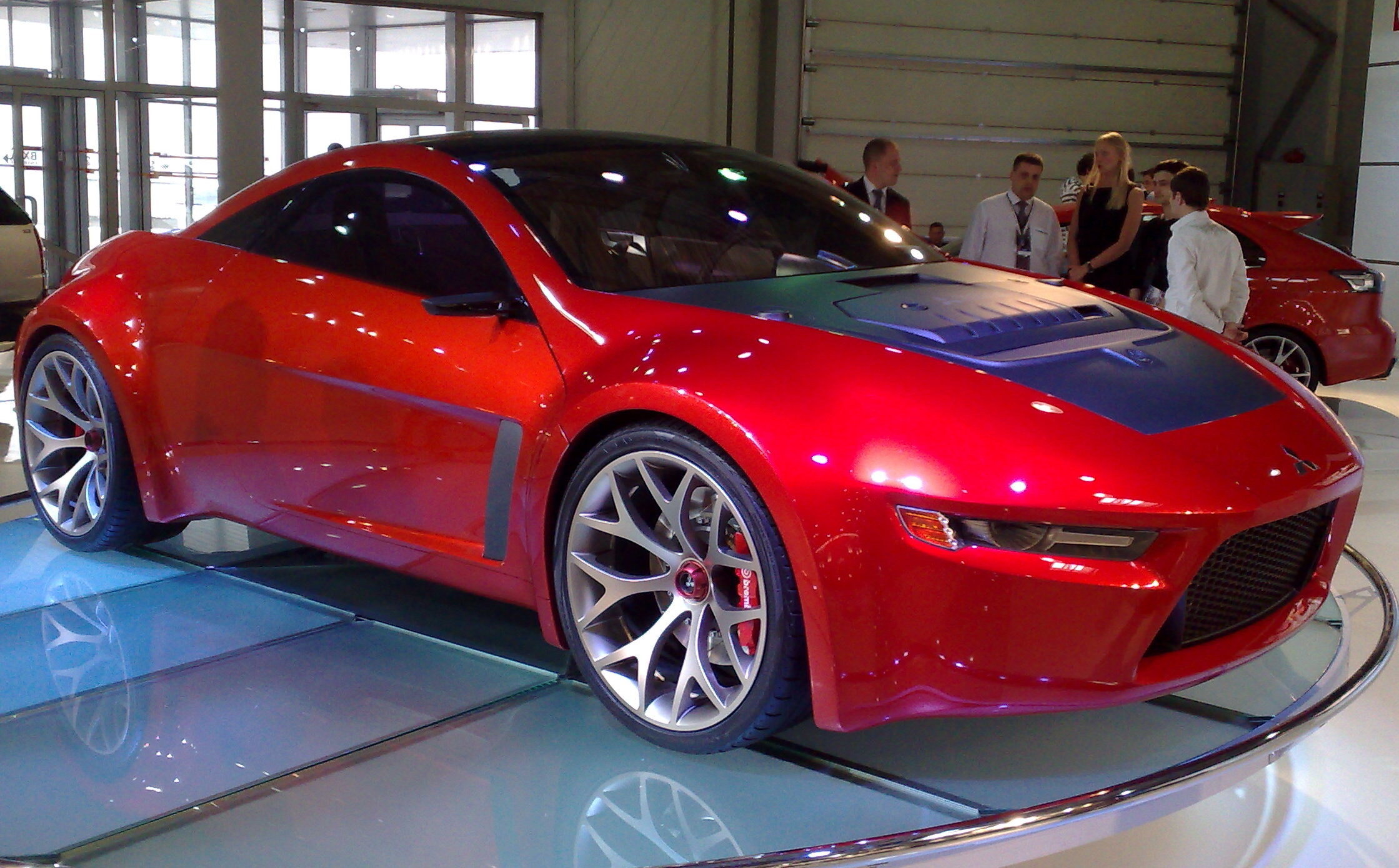

Overview
- Manufacturer: Mitsubishi Motors
- Production: 2008

Body and chassis
- Class: Concept car
- Body style: 2-door coupé
- Layout: Front engine, four-wheel drive

Powertrain
- Engine: 4N14 2.2-litre I4 diesel
- Transmission: SST twin-clutch transmission

Dimensions
- Wheelbase: 2,635 mm (103.7 in)
- Length: 4,445 mm (175.0 in)
- Width: 1,895 mm (74.6 in)
- Height: 1,315 mm (51.8 in)

The Mitsubishi Concept-RA is a concept car manufactured by Mitsubishi Motors, and first revealed at the North American International Auto Show in January 2008. It was speculated by the automotive press to presage a potential fifth generation of the Mitsubishi Eclipse.

The car has an aluminium space frame chassis, and features a 4N14 2.2-litre clean diesel producing 150 kW (204 PS; 201 hp) and 420 N⋅m (310 lbf⋅ft), powering all four wheels through the company's S-AWC drivetrain and SST twin-clutch transmission. Following the lead of other Mitsubishi prototypes at the time, "green plastic" recyclable resin was used extensively in the body panels and interior for environmental reasons.

== Gallery ==
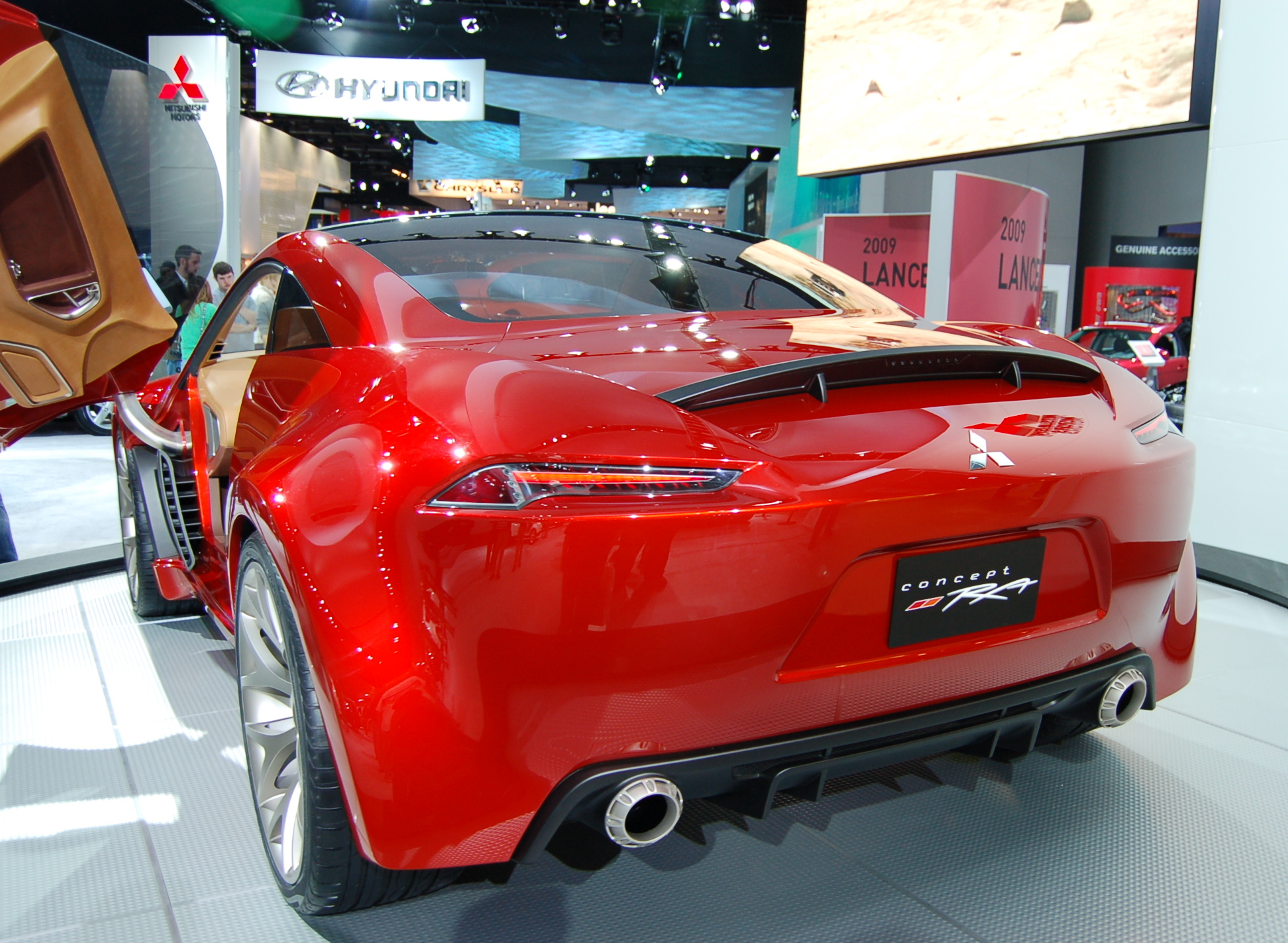
Mitsubishi Concept-RA at the 2008 North American International Auto Show

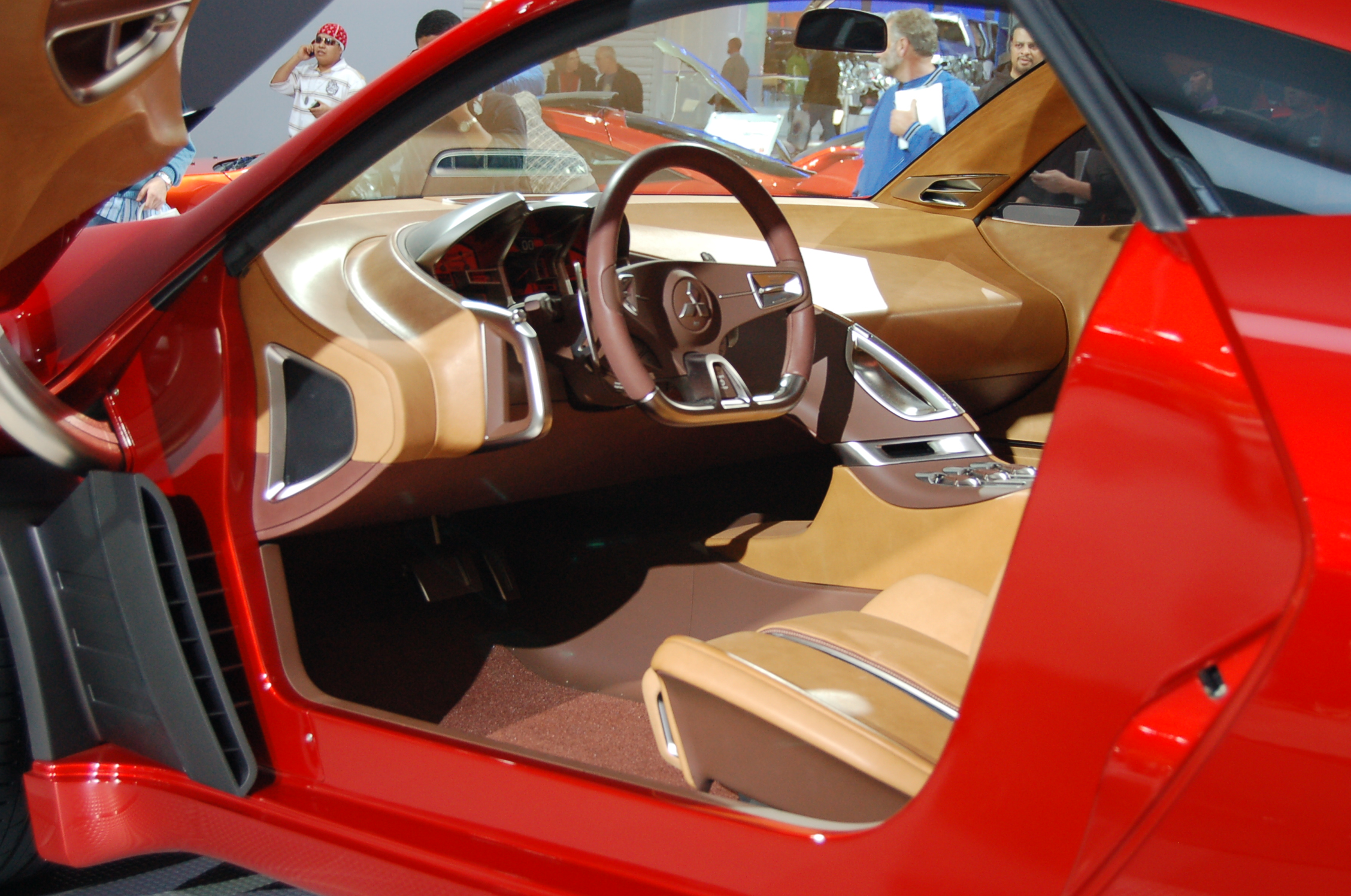
Interior
