= Mitsubishi Lancer Evolution X =

Mitsubishi Lancer Evolution X (CZ4A)
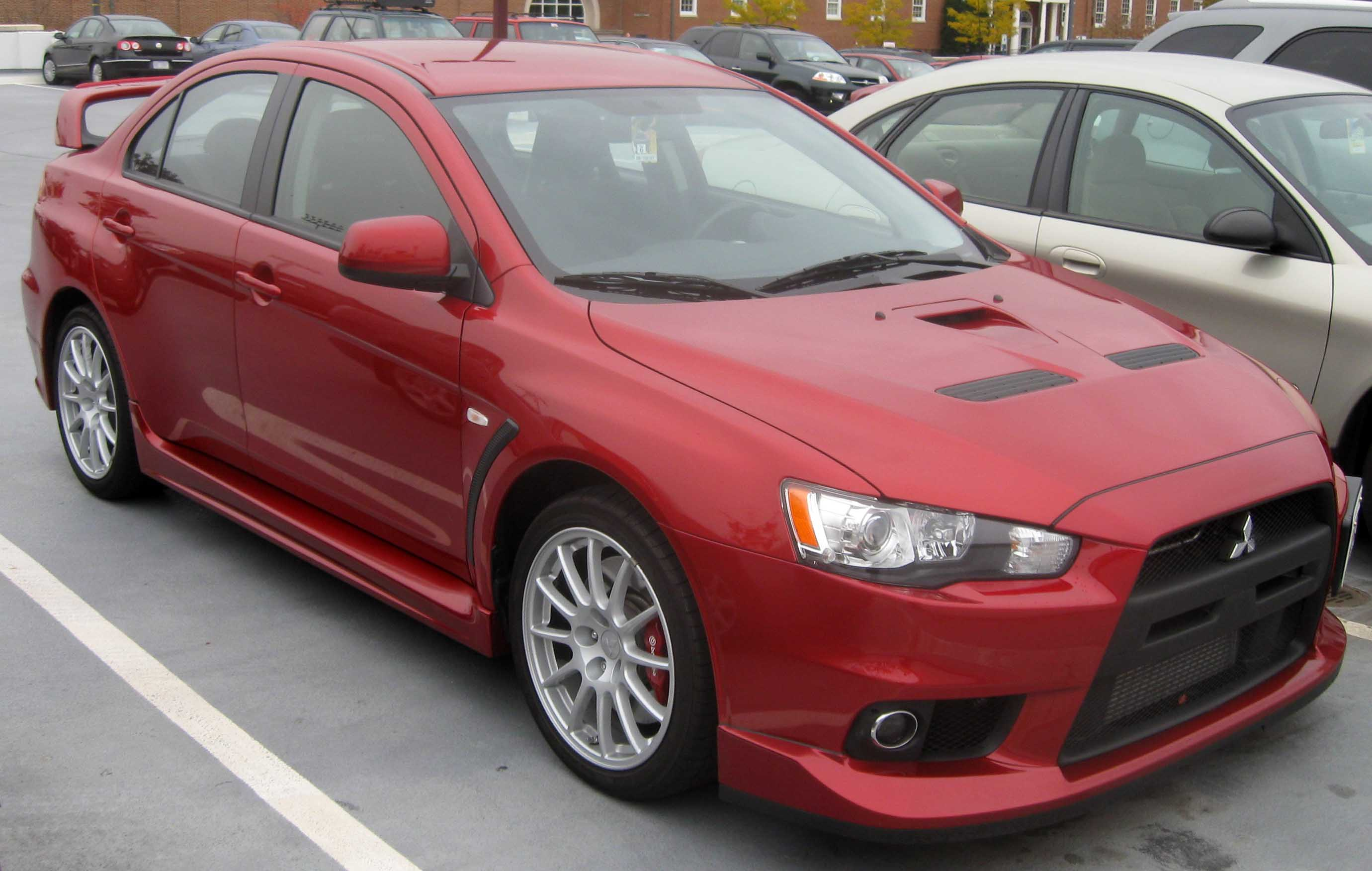

Overview
- Manufacturer: Mitsubishi Motors
- Production: October 2007 – May 2016
- Assembly: Kurashiki, Okayama, Japan (Mizushima Plant)
- Designer: Omer Halilhodžić

Body and chassis
- Class: Sport compact car Sports sedan
- Body style: 4-door sedan
- Layout: Front-engine, all-wheel-drive (S-AWC)
- Platform: Mitsubishi GS platform
- Related: Mitsubishi Lancer/Galant Fortis

Powertrain
- Engine: 2.0 L (1,998 cc) 4B11T I4-T (petrol)
- Power output: 280–446 PS (276–440 bhp; 206–328 kW)
- Transmission: 5-speed manual 6-speed TC-SST dual-clutch transmission

Dimensions
- Wheelbase: 2,650 mm (104 in)
- Length: 4,495 mm (177.0 in)
- Width: 1,810 mm (71 in)
- Height: 1,480 mm (58 in)
- Curb weight: 1,420–1,650 kg (3,131–3,638 lb)

Chronology
- Predecessor: Mitsubishi Lancer Evolution IX

The Mitsubishi Lancer Evolution X is the tenth and final generation of the Lancer Evolution, a sports sedan produced by Japanese manufacturer Mitsubishi Motors, designed by Omer Halilhodžić.

By September 2005, Mitsubishi introduced a concept version of the next-gen Evolution at the 39th Tokyo Motor Show named the Concept-X, designed by Omer Halilhodžić at the company's European design centre.

Mitsubishi unveiled a second concept car, the Prototype-X, at the 2007 North American International Auto Show (NAIAS).

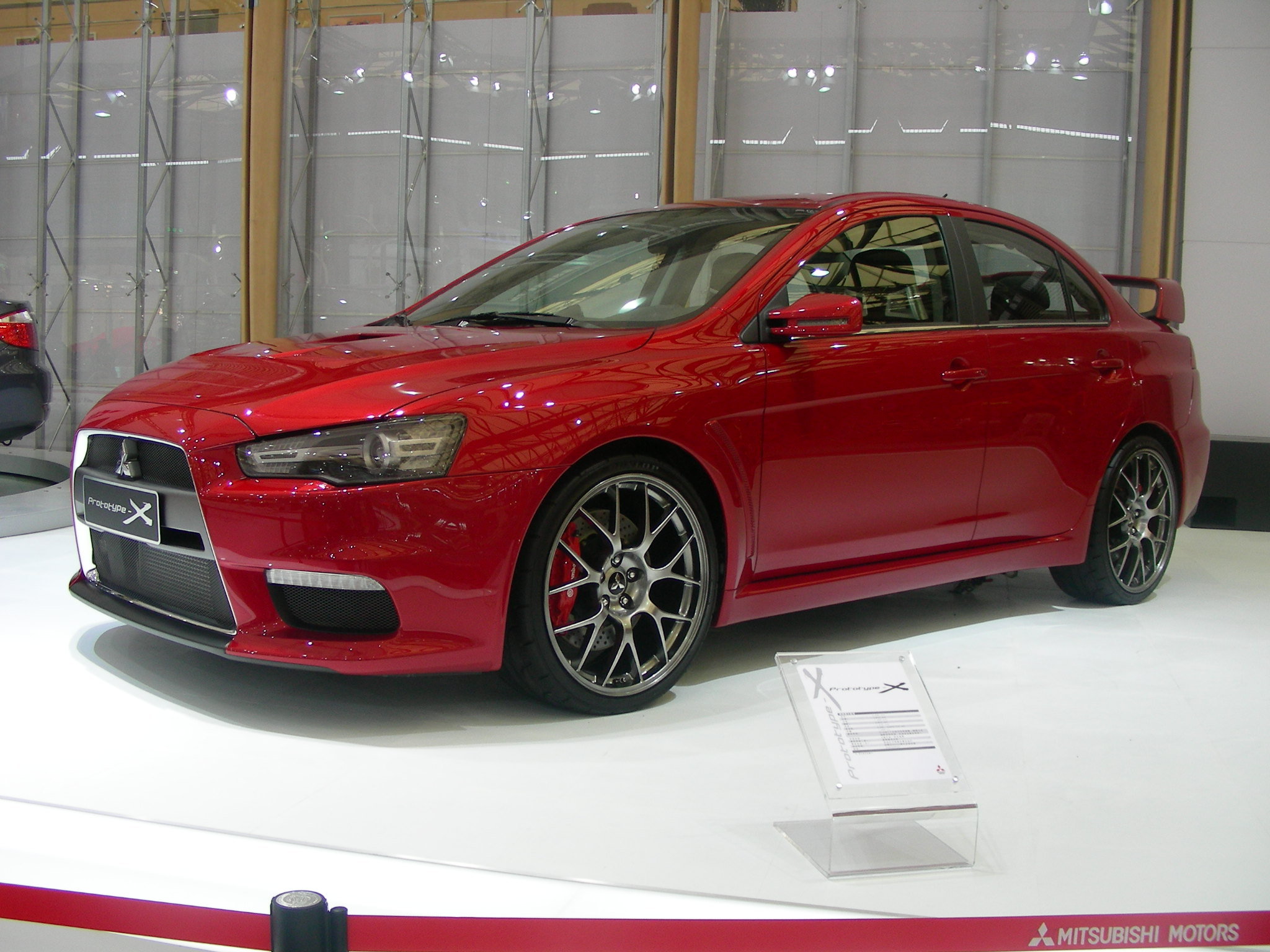
Mitsubishi Prototype X at the 2007 Shanghai Motor Show

The Lancer Evolution X sedan features a 4B11T 2.0L (1998cc) turbocharged, all-aluminium inline-4 GEMA engine. Power and torque depend on the market but all versions have at least 280 PS (206 kW; 276 hp). (JDM version), the American market version has slightly more. The UK models were reworked by Mitsubishi UK, in accordance with previous MR Evolutions bearing the FQ badge. Options for the UK Evolutions are 300 hp (220 kW) and 360 hp (270 kW).

Two versions of the car are offered in the U.S. The Lancer Evolution MR, with 6-speed Twin Clutch Sportronic Shift Transmission (TC-SST). The other version is the GSR which has a 5-speed manual transmission system. The car also has a new full-time four-wheel drive system named S-AWC (Super All Wheel Control), an advanced version of Mitsubishi's AWC system used in previous generations. The S-AWC uses torque vectoring technology to send different amounts of torque to the rear wheels.

It also featured Mitsubishi's new 6-speed SST dual-clutch automatic transmission with steering-mounted magnesium alloy shift paddles. It has replaced the Tiptronic automatic transmission, hence the SST version replaced the GT-A version (which was used in Evolution VII and Evolution IX Wagon). A 5-speed manual gearbox was also available. The Lancer Evolution also incorporated Mitsubishi's next-generation RISE safety body.

The Evolution X went on sale October 2, 2007 in Japan, January 2008 in the US, February in Canada (as the first version of Evolution in Canada) and by March 2008 in the UK. The Twin Clutch SST version was available in Japan from November 2007. Europe followed with sales in May, GSR and MR version included premium package. The introduction of the 2010 MR-Touring moved the car even further upscale. Leather and a moonroof became standard while revising the rear spoiler to just a lip spoiler.

In 2014, it was revealed that Mitsubishi would discontinue production of the Mitsubishi Lancer Evolution after the 2015 model year.

== Regions ==
=== Japanese models ===
The engine is the 4B11T-type 2.0 litre turbo inline-4. The Evolution X can accelerate from 0–100 km/h (62 mph) in 4.5 to 4.7 seconds. Aluminum is used in the roof panel, hood, front fenders and the rear spoiler frame structure. The launch model's engine was rated at 280 PS (206 kW; 276 hp) at 6,500 rpm and 422 N⋅m (311 lb⋅ft) at 3,500 rpm. Following the repeal of the 276 horsepower Gentleman's Agreement in Japan, engine power was raised to 300 PS (221 kW; 296 hp) at 6,500 rpm beginning in 2009 model year.

- RS – 5 speed manual transmission. 16-inch wheels.
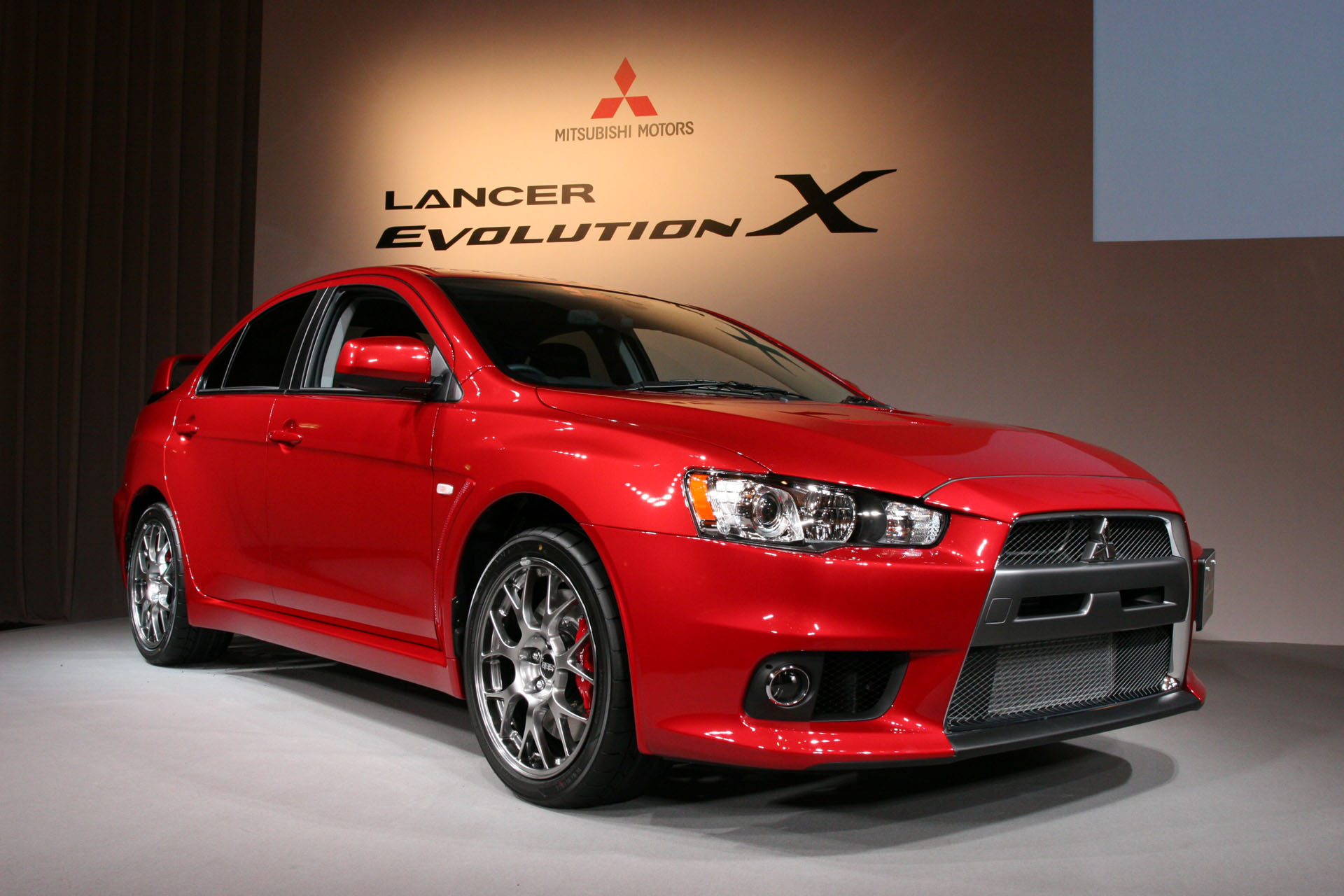
- Mitsubishi Lancer Evolution X
  GSR – Standard rear spoiler. 5-speed manual transmission or 6-speed twin-clutch SST transmission (magnesium paddle shifters on SST model). 245/40R18 Yokohama ADVAN A13C tire on Enkei 12-spoke high-rigidity cast alloy wheels or optional BBS lightweight alloy wheels. Brembo ventilated disc brakes. Standard S-AWC 4WD system. Driver and front passenger dual-stage airbags. Standard engine immobiliser with security alarm. Optional Mitsubishi Motors Communication System (MMCS) which comprises a 30 Gb hard disk drive audio/navigation system with 7 in (177.8 mm) LCD screen. Optional Rockford Fosgate premium sound system. Optional keyless remote entry.

GSR can be fitted with the following packages:

- High Performance Package – Bilstein single-tube shock absorbers and Eibach coil springs, Brembo 2-piece disc brakes, high-performance tires with stiffer walls and better grip.
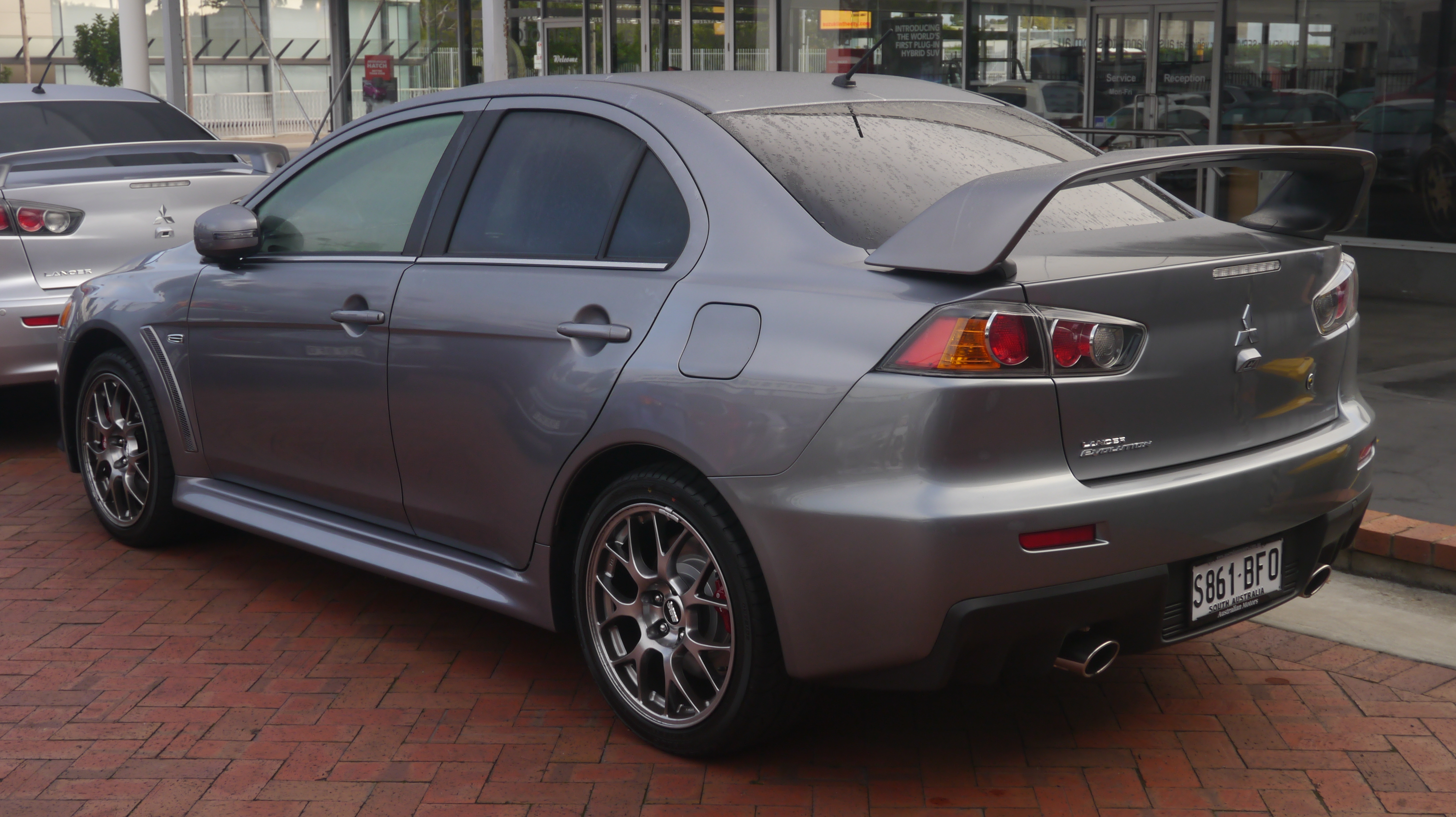
- Lancer Evolution X rear
  Stylish Exterior Package – Chrome finish for the front grille lattice and beltline molding, body color-keyed fender vents, adds fog lamps.
- Leather Combination Interior – The seats match the color of the exterior.
- Premium Package – All 3 above packages plus 18 in (457 mm) BBS lightweight alloy wheels.
- GSR-Premium – Replacement of Premium Package beginning with 2009 model year, but added MMCS and Rockford Fosgate premium audio.
- GSR Tuned by RALLIART – The Ralliart version was launched again in 2007, this limited edition for Lancer Evolution X is exclusively tuned by Mitsubishi Ralliart Japan equipped with a 5-speed manual transmission, Ralliart RA04 Wheels 18 inch forged 1-piece black aluminum sport wheels paired with Yokohama ADVAN Neova AD08 tires. Aerodynamic parts include a newly designed carbon fiber front under-spoiler, hood air dam, and front bumper air intake duct, and the intake and exhaust system has been tuned to get the best out of the engine. The interior is fitted with a motorsport shell-type full bucket seat jointly developed with Recaro. Official Ralliart livery was included in the package together with the Rockford Fosgate premium sound system with Mitsubishi Motors Communication System (MMCS) which comprises a 30Gb hard disk drive audio/navigation system with 7 in (180 mm) LCD screen. Its highly tuned 4B11T engine has maximum power output of 300 bhp (304 PS; 224 kW) or more.
- Final Edition - Based on the Evo GSR, this 5-speed-manual-only edition comes with black leather Recaros with red accent stitching, 18-inch BBS wheels, Bilstein and Eibach suspension bits, and Brembo brakes, along with the requisite "Final Edition" badging and a numbered dash plaque. Only 1,000 were made for the JDM.

=== North American models ===
Engine produces 295 PS (217 kW; 291 hp) at 6,500 rpm and 407 N⋅m (300 lb⋅ft) at 4,400 rpm.

- GSR – Same as base Japanese GSR with large spoiler. (available only with a 5-speed manual transmission)
- MR – 6-speed TC-SST transmission. Suspension with Eibach springs and Bilstein struts. 18-inch BBS forged alloy wheels. Xenon High-Intensity Discharge (HID) headlamps. Color-keyed large rear spoiler. Leather and sueded seating. Electronic keyless entry and starting system. Steering wheel-mounted audio controls. Bluetooth handsfree cellular phone interface system with voice recognition.
- MR Premium – MR with a Rockford Fosgate Navigation/Stereo with 9 speakers.
- MR Touring – (2010) Major differences from the MR are the rear-lip spoiler, heated full-leather seats, upgraded interior trim, and a power-sunroof on a steel roof.
- SE – (late 2010–11) Is a combination of all three 2010 models; some key features are the GSR front grille and interior, MR rear diffusers, 6-speed TC-SST transmission, Eibach springs and Bilstein struts, MR touring rear-lip spoiler, and heated seats. Only 340 were produced in the United States. A special key fob with the series number and a letter of acknowledgment from Shin Kurihara were given to the purchaser of this trim.
- Final Edition - (2015) 1,600 units allocated to the US and 350 units allocated to Canada were produced with 18-inch Enkei dark alloy wheels, 303 hp (307 PS; 226 kW) and 305 lb⋅ft (414 N⋅m) of torque, red-stitched all black interior, black-painted aluminum roof, final edition badge.

Option packages:

- (GSR only) Sight, Sound and Spoiler Package – Xenon HID headlamps with manual leveling; large rear spoiler (starting in 2011, the large rear spoiler is standard in all models); FAST-Key electronic entry and starting system; 750-watt (maximum) Rockford Fosgate audio system; in-dash 6-disc CD changer; Sirius Satellite Radio with three months prepaid subscription.
- (GSR - Canada only) Handling package - Bilstein Shocks, Eibach springs, 2-piece front rotors, forged BBS wheels, large spoiler.
- (MR and MR Touring) Technology Package: Mitsubishi Multi Communication System, GPS navigation with Diamond Lane Guidance; 30 Gb hard disc drive with Digital Music Server, in-dash DVD/CD player, multifunction 7-inch (177.8 mm) color LCD touchscreen, 650 (710 for 2010 model)-watt (maximum) Rockford Fosgate high-performance audio system, Sirius Satellite Radio with six months prepaid subscription.

=== UK models ===
UK cars kept the Evolution X name.

- GS – Base Japanese GSR with Enkei or BBS wheels, 5-speed manual transmission, radio and music server (MMCS), Rockford Fosgate premium audio, iPod/MP3 auxiliary input port.
- GSR SST (FQ-300, FQ-330) – GSR FQ-300 with 6-speed twin-clutch SST transmission with SST mode selection (normal, sport, super sport). GSR SST FQ-330 was released in 2009.

Variants:

- FQ-300 – Engine rated at 295 PS (217 kW; 291 hp) at 6,500 rpm torque 407 N⋅m (300 lb⋅ft) at 3,500 rpm.
- FQ-330 – Engine rated at 329 PS (242 kW; 324 hp) at 6,500 rpm torque 437 N⋅m (322 lb⋅ft) at 3,500 rpm.
- FQ-360 – Engine rated at 359 PS (264 kW; 354 hp) at 6,500 rpm torque 492 N⋅m (363 lb⋅ft) at 3,500 rpm. Carbon fibre front lip spoiler, rear vortex generator, gear knob, hand brake. Front leather Recaro seats.
- FQ-400 – Engine rated at 409 PS (301 kW; 403 hp) at 6,500 rpm torque 525 N⋅m (387 lb⋅ft) at 3500 rpm. It also includes 5 speed manual transmission, six-piston brake calipers, upgraded brakes and 18-inch wheels fitted with Toyo Proxes R1R tyres (summers) or Toyo Snowprox S953 tyres (winters), a new aero kit that includes additional cooling intakes, vents, a larger air intake in the hood and ducts. An estimated 100 vehicles would be made. It accelerates 0–62 mph (100 km/h) in 3.8 seconds (est.) and has an electronically limited top speed of 155 mph (249 km/h). Standard equipment is comprehensive, the FQ-400 coming with Bluetooth hands-free telephone connection, a CD-tuner with 30 GB hard drive, DVD satellite navigation and privacy glass, remote central locking, automatic headlamps and rain-sensitive windscreen wipers. The FQ-400 was available for £49,999 (list price).
- FQ-440 MR – Engine rated at 446 PS (328 kW; 440 hp) at 6800 rpm and 559 N⋅m (412 lb⋅ft) of torque at 3100 rpm. Released in 2014 as a special edition with only 40 units available. It was available with the 6-speed TC-SST transmission and only the Frost White colour priced at £50,000.

=== European models ===
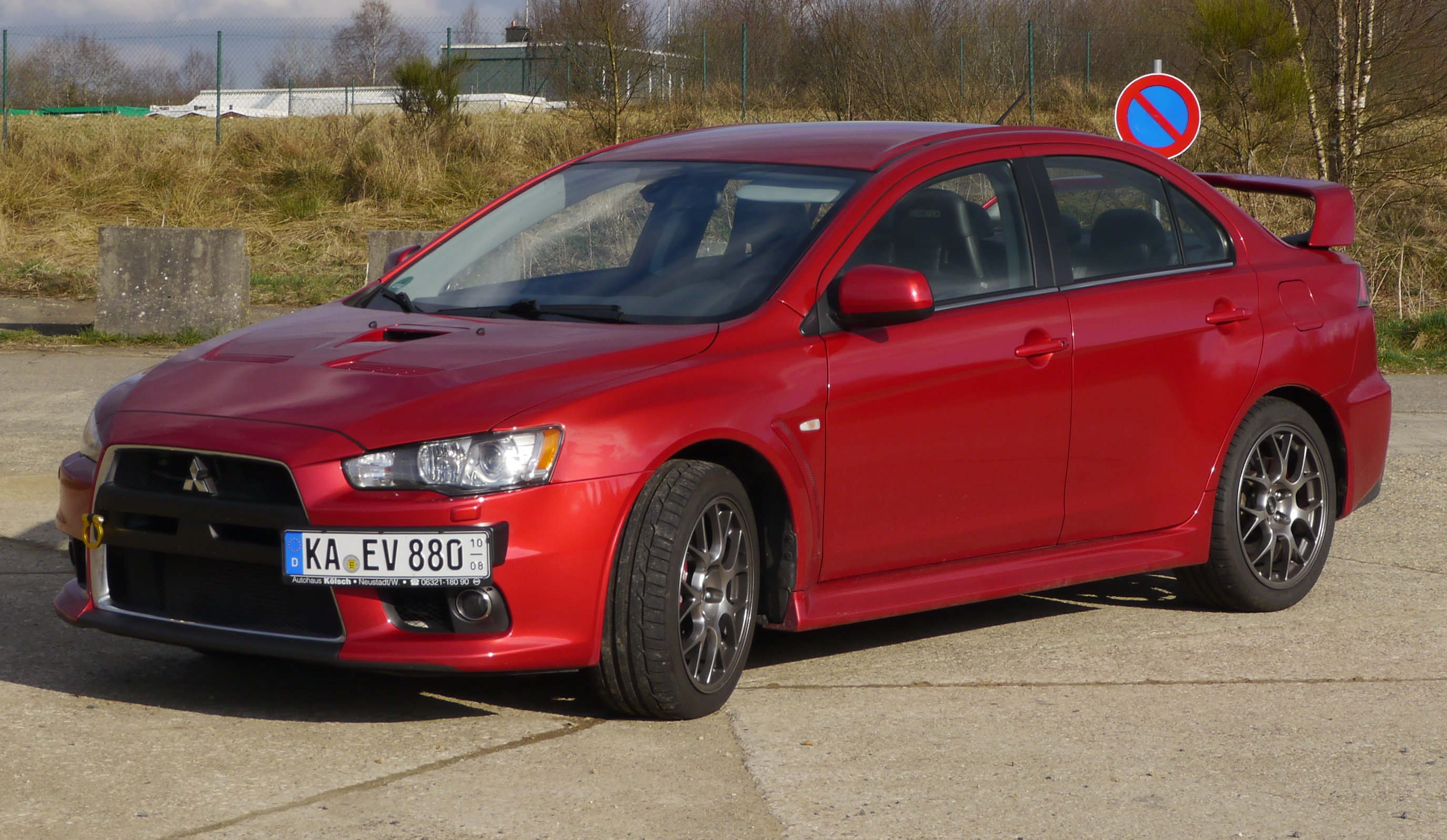
Mitsubishi Lancer Evolution X MR TC-SST in Germany

Acceleration: 0–100 km/h (62 mph) 4.8 sec. with 1,560 kg (3,439 lb); and 4.9 sec. with 1,600 kg (3,527 lb). Engine rated at 295 PS (217 kW; 291 hp) at 6,500 rpm and 366 N⋅m (270 lb⋅ft) of torque at 3,500 rpm.

- GSR – 5 speed manual (GSR 5 M/T) or 6-speed TC-SST transmission (GSR TC-SST).
- MR TC-SST – 6-speed TC-SST transmission. Suspension with Eibach springs and Bilstein struts. 18-inch BBS forged alloy wheels. Xenon High-Intensity Discharge (HID) headlamps. Mitsubishi Multi Communication System.

=== Brazilian models ===
The Lancer Evolution X arrived in Brazil in 2008 and is sold only with the twin-clutch transmission.

- GSR - 6 speed TC-SST transmission, 18-inch BBS forged alloy wheels, Recaro racing seats, 7-inch multimedia system.
- Carbon Series - Based on GSR version, special series limited in 40 units that have elements in carbon fiber, they are: The air intakes and exits of the hood, mirrors, air extractor in the rear, front spoiler and support of the plate and a new rear spoiler (ducktail). They accompany BBS wheels in graphite color and darkened lanterns.
- 2015 John Easton Edition - Specially created for the Brazilian market, this last edition comes with a 340 PS (335 bhp; 250 kW) and 475 N⋅m (350 lb⋅ft) of torque engine, grille outline in red and is limited to 100 units.

=== Australian / New Zealand models ===
Engine rated at 295 PS (217 kW; 291 bhp) at 6,500 rpm and 366 N⋅m (270 lb⋅ft) of torque at 3,500 rpm.

- GSR – 5-speed manual or 6-speed TC-SST transmission.
- MR – 6-speed TC-SST transmission. Suspension with Eibach springs and Bilstein struts. 18-inch BBS forged alloy wheels, 2 pieces front brake, aluminium rear spoiler, auto leveling Xenon High-Intensity Discharge (HID) headlamps. Mitsubishi Multi-Communication System, leather combination seat trim, heated front seats.
- Bathurst Edition – A-Team Mitsubishi Ralliart Australia upgraded/tuned version Evolution X with a rated power output of 336 PS (331 bhp; 247 kW) and 436 N⋅m (322 lbf⋅ft) of torque. The Team Mitsubishi Ralliart (TMR) Bathurst Edition is the most powerful road-legal Lancer Evolution X to be offered in Australia as a new car. The Bathurst Edition is available with either the standard 5-speed manual or the TC-SST 6-speed automatic transmission, with a limited run of 100 units. It is covered by the MMAL factory warranty.
- Final Edition - A send-off version with 150 units delivered to Australia with an additional 30 units made available to New Zealand. Based on the Evolution GSR, this 5-speed-manual-only edition comes with black leather Recaro seats with red accent stitching, 18-inch BBS wheels, Bilstein and Eibach suspension upgrades, and Brembo brakes, along with the requisite "Final Edition" badging and a numbered dash plaque. This model has 'Enhanced engine power' (over the GSR model) with a power output of 226 kW (307 PS; 303 bhp) and 414 N⋅m (305 lbf⋅ft) of torque.

=== Singapore models ===
- RS – 5-speed manual transmission.
- GSR - Same as Japanese Base GSR
- GSR SST - GSR with 6-speed TC-SST gearbox.

=== Philippine models ===
The Philippines received its Evolution X in November 2008 and is the same as the USDM versions. The trims and specs are almost the same, excluding the MR Touring model from the USDM.

- GSR- 5-speed manual, and the same specs with the USDM GSR with large spoiler.
- MR- 6-speed TC-SST gearbox, and the same specs with the USDM MR, excluding the Technology Package.

=== Malaysia models ===
In Malaysia, the Lancer Evolution X is available with only a 6-speed Twin Clutch SST transmission. Front license plates are aligned towards the center or right of the fascia. In 2009, the Royal Malaysian Police acquired a fleet of 5-speed manual-equipped Lancer Evolution X to be used in high-speed pursuits.

== Final Edition ==
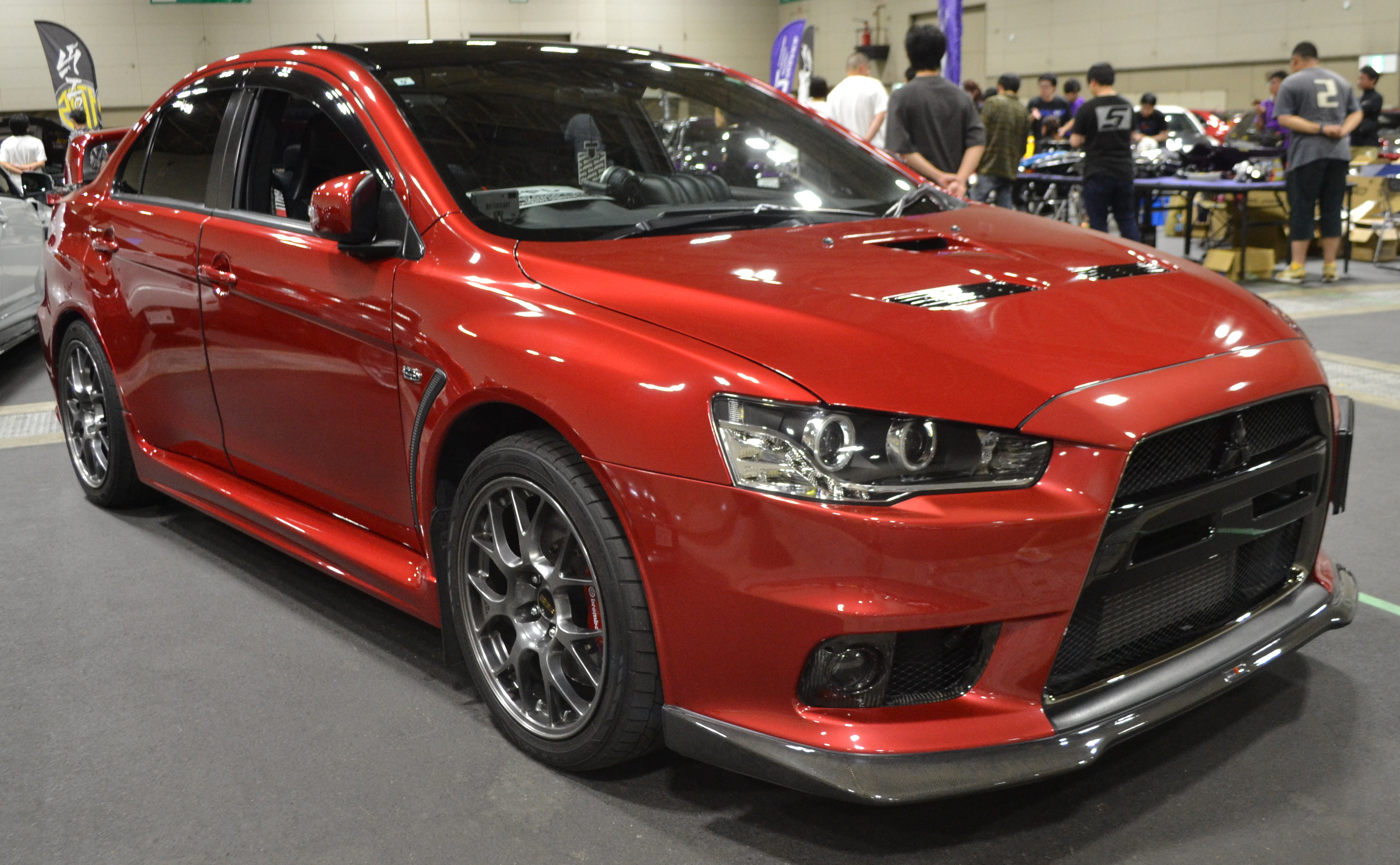
Lancer Evolution X Final Edition (with an aftermarket front splitter)

A "Final Edition" (FE) trim was offered for sale after Mitsubishi announced that production of the Lancer Evolution would end after the 2015 model year. It had special production badges that were put on the center console indicating which number it is of the allocated amount per market. Being based on the GSR trim, a 5-speed manual transmission was mandatory. It also featured a black roof, "Final Edition" emblems, and darker Enkei wheels. Power was increased from 291 hp to 303 hp.

The Evolution X Final Edition was first made available in Japan, where 1,000 units were produced for the domestic market, with limited customization options. 150 of them were made available to the Australian and New Zealand market(s) as grey market imports. Only 350 units of the 2015 Mitsubishi Lancer Evolution Final Edition were sold in Canada, while another 1,600 units were sent to the United States.
