= Halilhodžić =

Halilhodžić is a Bosnian surname. Notable people with the surname include:

- Omer Halilhodžić (born 1963), Bosnian automobile designer
- Vahid Halilhodžić (born 1952), Bosnian footballer and manager
