= Launch control (automotive) =

Electronic aid for drivers of racing cars

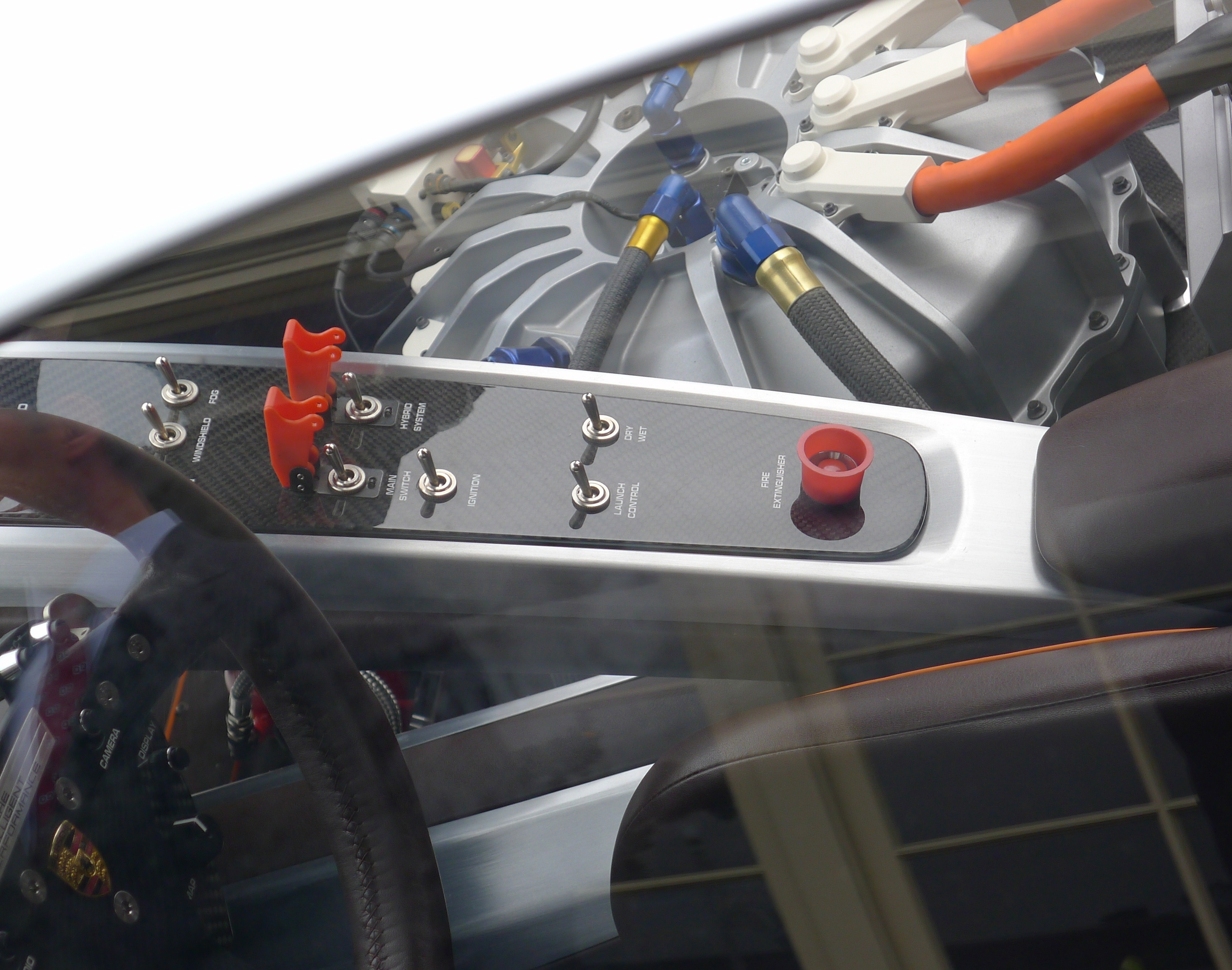
Switch for activating launch control in the center console of a Porsche 918 RSR.

Launch control is an electronic aid to assist drivers of both racing and street cars to accelerate from a standing start. Motorcycles have been variously fitted with mechanical and electronic devices for both street and race.

Popular automobiles with launch control include the BMW M series, certain marques of the Volkswagen Group with Direct-Shift Gearbox (most notably the Bugatti Veyron), Porsche 911 (sport+ mode), Panamera Turbo, Alfa Romeo with TCT gearbox and certain General Motors products. Mitsubishi also incorporated launch control into their Twin Clutch SST gearbox, on its "S-Sport" mode, but the mode is only available in the Evolution X MR and MR Touring (USDM). The Jaguar F-Type includes launch control. The Nissan GT-R has electronics to control launch but the company does not use the term "launch control" since some owners have equated the term with turning off the stability control to launch the car, which may void the warranty of the drivetrain. One version of Nissan GT-R allows the user to launch the car by turning the Traction Control to "R" mode.

== Operation ==
Launch control is, in essence, a second rev limiter. Launch control operates by using an electronic accelerator and a computer program in a drive-by-wire application, and through fuel or spark cut in a mechanical throttle application. The software can control acceleration based on engine specifications to make the car accelerate smoothly and as fast as possible, avoiding spinning of the drive wheels, engine failure due to over-revving and clutch and gearbox problems. Looking more in depth, launch control holds the engine's RPM at a set number, allowing the car to build power before the computer or operator engages the clutch. In racing cars, this feature is only available at the start of the race, when the car is stationary in the starting grid. After the car is running at a certain speed, the software is disabled. Traditional launch control is only feasible in cars with a clutch or clutch pack, or any automobile with a manual transmission or dual-clutch transmission. Road cars with automatic transmissions typically have software performing brake-torquing, the action of simultaneously maintaining a wide-open throttle and holding the brake to initiate a rapid start. This is different from launch control.

== Aftermarket launch control ==
- Two-Step Rev Limiting

Modern vehicles are increasingly becoming available with launch control features straight from the factory. However, if a vehicle doesn’t come equipped with such features, aftermarket forms of launch control can be purchased and installed. A common form of aftermarket launch control is commonly known as two-step rev limiting. A two-step rev limiter is a module that regulates the engines rpms for a controlled launch and optimal power settings. Two step limiting confines rpms at two separate points. The first point is programmed to limit the revolutions to a desirable launch range and the second point is limited to protect the engine from over revving. The limiting itself is controlled through the modulator by regulating the fuel and ignition. Once the desired revolutions are met the two-step system will adjust these parameters allowing for power production to cease until released. Aftermarket two step rev limitation is only a viable option with a manual transmission. Launch control for an automatic transmission car requires a different set up.

== Reason for use ==
Racing drivers have only a very short time at the start of a race in which to achieve competitive acceleration. High power delivery to the gearbox and driven wheels cannot easily be managed even by the most skilled drivers.

Launch control is also highly useful in turbocharged engines. Due to the nature of how a turbocharger works, a driver cannot ensure to have 100 percent of the engine's torque at a moment's notice. With a launch control system, a driver can ensure that the turbocharger receives enough exhaust pressure to maintain boost pressure. This effect can be further amplified by having the launch control software progressively retard ignition timing up to a set RPM.

Launch control was originally intended to give cars the ability to accelerate as fast as possible regarding optimal engine conditions from a stop. However, car communities around the United States have begun to organize events surrounded around the byproduct of launch control systems, this byproduct is usually called a backfire. Using aftermarket launch control systems allows for drivers to manipulate the fuel and ignition settings. To create a backfire, the ignition settings are turned down allowing for a build up of excess fuel which creates a larger combustion producing loud bangs and pops from the exhaust. In some instances the launch control systems are modified to produce large flames that also expel from the exhaust pipe. Competitions are held in car communities based on achieving the loudest backfire or producing the largest flame.

== History ==
Developments in electronics in the 1980s enabled the introduction of launch control. In 1985, Renault's RE60 F1 car stored information on a diskette which was later unloaded at the pits, giving the engineers detailed data about the car's behavior. Later, telemetry allowed the data to be sent by radio between the pits and the car. Increasing the use of electronics on the car allowed engineers to modify the settings of certain parameters whilst it was on the track, which is called bi-directional telemetry.

Among the electronic driving aids were a semi-automatic transmission, an anti-lock braking system (ABS), a traction control system, and active suspension. The 1993 Williams FW15C model featured all of these aids. This trend was ended by the FIA when it outlawed these aids for the 1994 season, considering that they reduced the importance of driver skill to too great a degree. Bi-directional telemetry was also forbidden, which was soon reinstated as the FIA found it too hard to analyze the engine programmes in order to search for hidden code that could be found breaking the rules.

Fully-automatic transmissions, traction control, and launch control were allowed again from the 2001 Spanish Grand Prix, but as of the 2004 and 2008 season, they were outlawed in order to reduce the money needed for a competitive F1 team.

From being a feature that was predominately seen only in race cars, launch control is now featured in almost all modern consumer car brands. Brands such as BMW, Dodge, and Mercedes all have implemented a launch feature in select models of their vehicles.

== Motorcycle usage ==
Street motorcycles have been fitted with factory devices to balance power characteristics to rider requirements. Competition entrants can call it "holeshot". Race machines are increasingly using additional suspension-altering technology to lower the stance and aid aerodynamics. Front holeshot devices (also referred as front ride height devices) were banned from MotoGP starting from 2023, with a blanket ban on such devices set to be enacted in 2027.

Motocross bikes use mechanical holeshot devices to temporarily compress the front suspension prior to race-start.

== Gallery ==
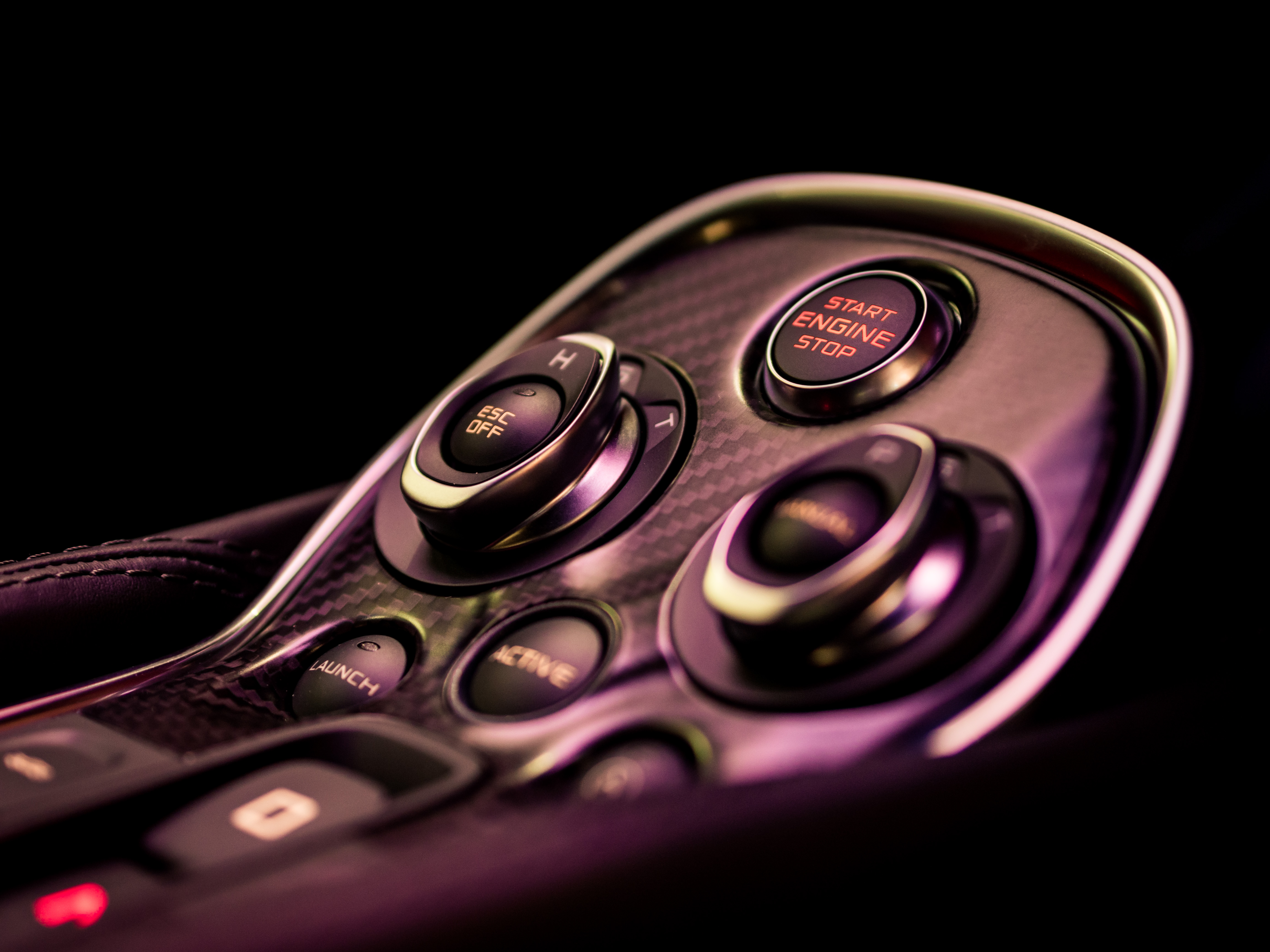
Center console where the launch control switch can be seen to the left

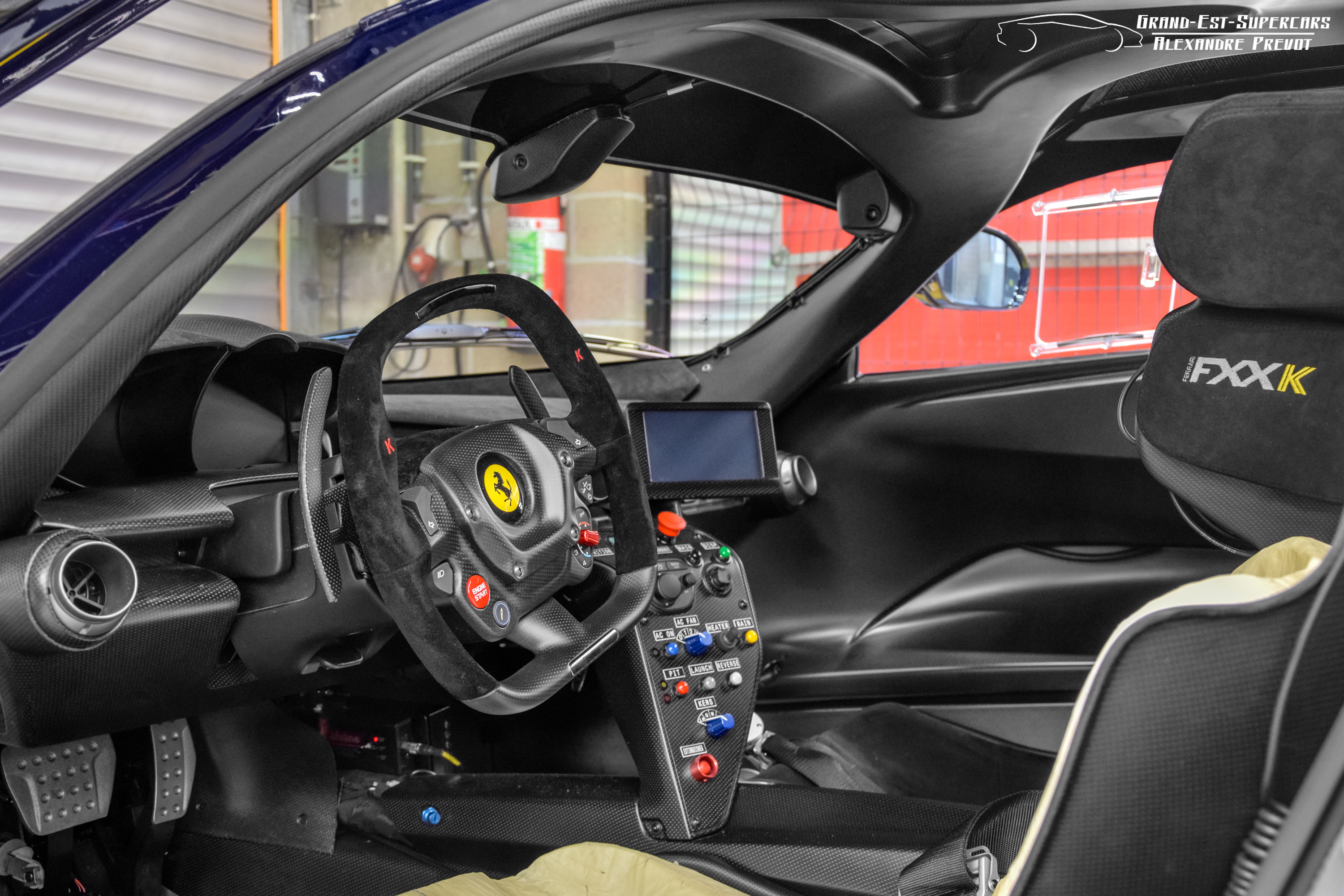
Picture of the cabin of a Ferrari FXX, where the launch control button can be seen in the middle of the center console

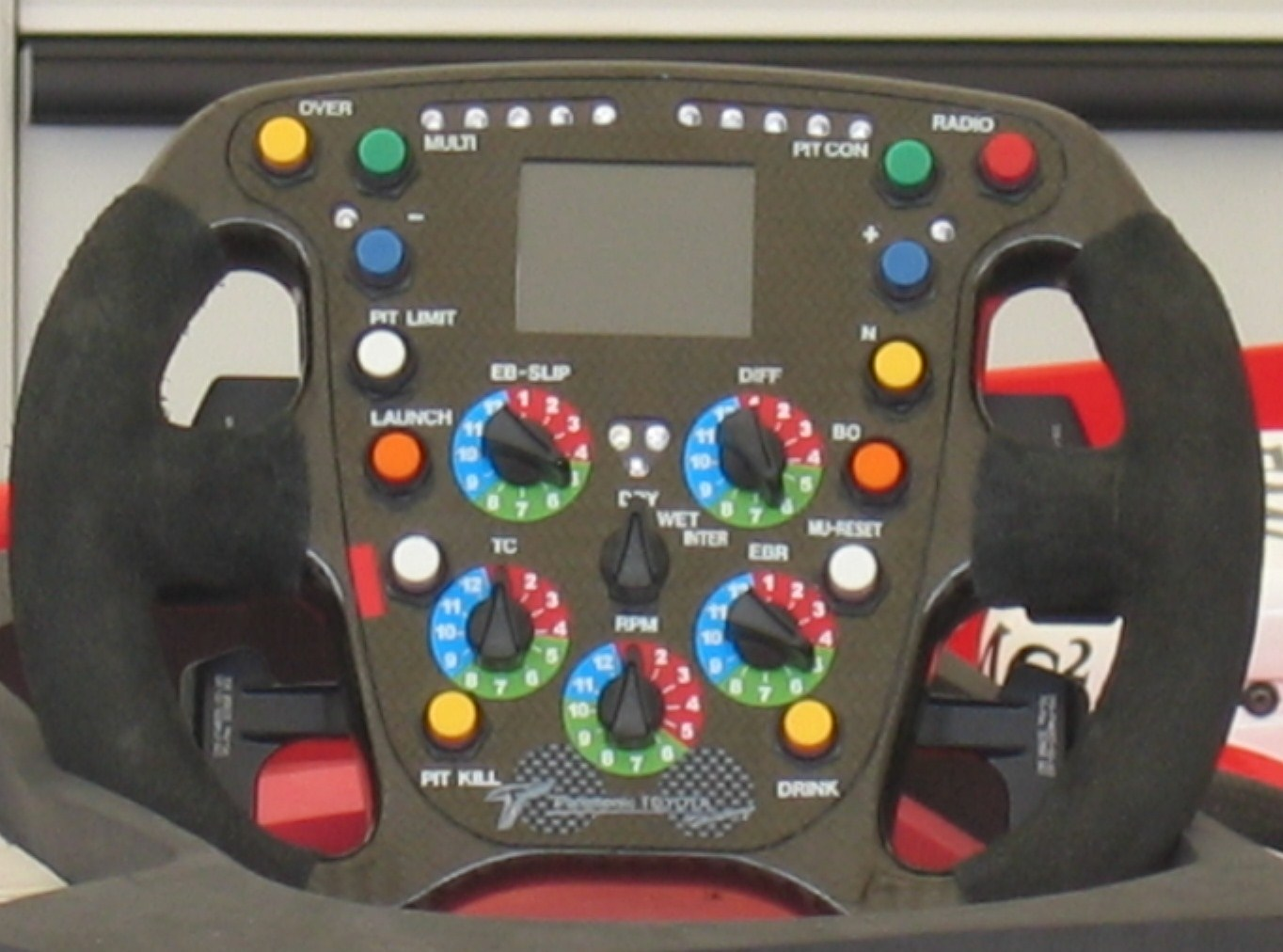
Toyota Formula 1 steering wheel with a launch control button in the middle to the left

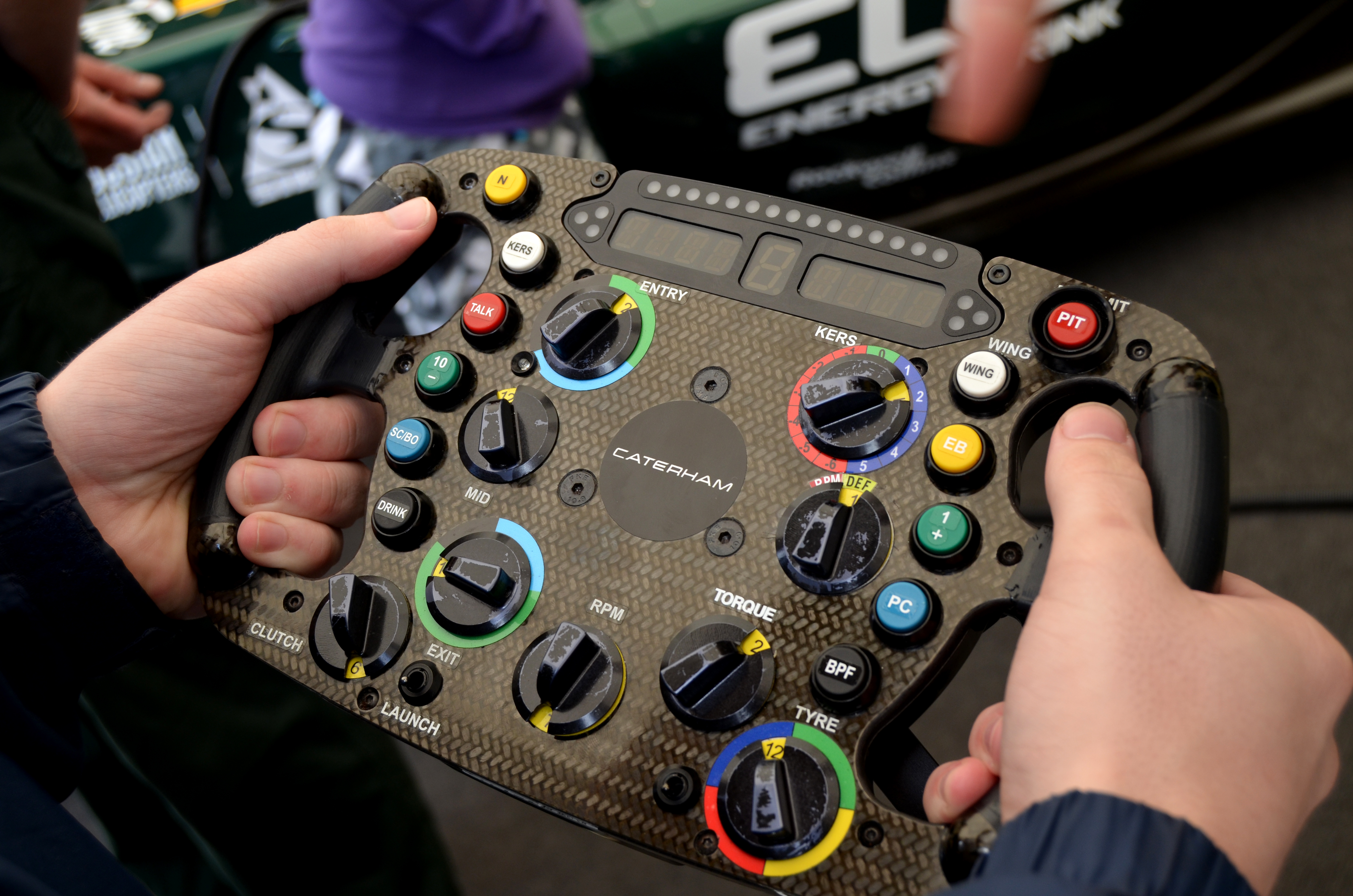
Caterham Formula 1 with a launch control button at the mid-bottom
