= Mitsubishi 4N1 engine =

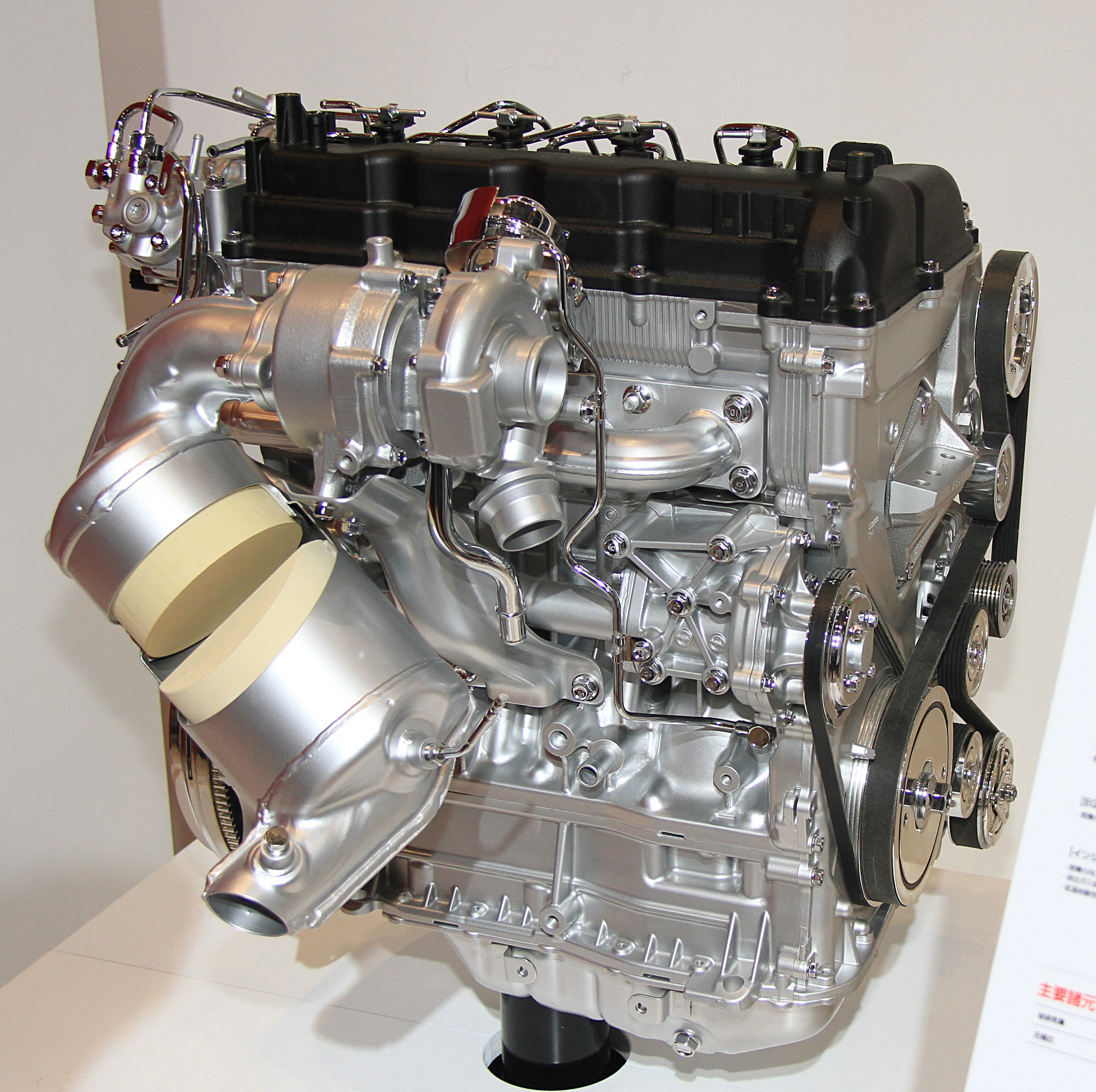

Overview
- Manufacturer: Mitsubishi Motors
- Production: 2010–present

Layout
- Configuration: 4-cylinder
- Displacement: 1.8–2.4 L (1,798–2,442 cc)
- Cylinder bore: 83 mm (3.27 in); 86 mm (3.39 in)
- Piston stroke: 83.1 mm (3.27 in); 97.6 mm (3.84 in); 105.1 mm (4.14 in)
- Cylinder block material: Aluminium die cast
- Cylinder head material: Aluminium die cast
- Valvetrain: DOHC, 16 valves, variable valve timing MIVEC (intake)
- Compression ratio: 14.9:1-15.5:1

Combustion
- Turbocharger: Variable geometry with intercooler
- Fuel system: Common rail direct injection
- Fuel type: Diesel
- Cooling system: Water-cooled

Output
- Power output: 85–150 kW (116–204 PS)
- Torque output: 300–470 N⋅m (221–347 lb⋅ft)

Chronology
- Predecessor: Mitsubishi Sirius engine (Diesel Engine)

The Mitsubishi 4N1 engines are a family of all-alloy four-cylinder diesel engines developed by Mitsubishi Motors, produced at the company's powertrain facility in Kyoto, Japan for use in Mitsubishi's small to mid-sized global passenger cars.

In June 2006, Mitsubishi Motors Mitsubishi Heavy Industries and Renault announced a joint development project for a new generation of clean diesel engines to be used in cars exported to Europe with a target of beginning mass production in 2010 and later announced that the engines will be gradually phased into other global markets.

The preliminary version of the 1.8 L (1,798 cc) engine was first seen in the Concept-cX test car introduced in 2007. The larger 2.3 L (2,268 cc) was first exhibited in the Concept-ZT test car introduced in the same year and later used in the Concept-RA test car introduced in 2008.

With a clean diesel emission performance in mind, all engines are designed to comply with Tier 2 Bin 5 emission regulations in the United States, Euro 5 standard in Europe and Japan's Post New Long Term regulations.

Together with Mitsubishi's electric vehicle technology the new diesel engines are positioned as a core element in the Mitsubishi Motors Environment Initiative Program 2010 (EIP 2010) announced in July 2006.

The 4N1 engine family is the world's first to feature a variable valve timing (intake side) system applied to passenger car diesel engines.

All engines developed within this family have aluminium cylinder block, double overhead camshaft layouts, 4 valves per cylinder, a common rail injection system with a variable-geometry turbocharger. Most of those engine have the MIVEC variable valve timing system. The 4N14 2.3 L (2,268 cc) has been distributed in the ASX and Delica without MIVEC.

== Engine family characteristics ==
Mitsubishi's new clean diesel engines use a 200 MPa (2,000 bar) high-pressure common rail injection system to improve combustion efficiency. The 4N13 1.8 L (1,798 cc) uses solenoid fuel-injectors. The larger 4N14 2.3 L (2,268 cc) engine uses piezo fuel-injectors that produce a finer fuel spray. Both engines feature a fast ceramic glowplug system. The engines are designed to operate at a lower compression ratio, thus lowering the combustion pressure, allowing the use of an aluminium cylinder block that reduces weight.

The 4N13 1.8 L (1,798 cc) engine uses a variable geometry (VG) turbocharger with a variable vane turbine, which provides optimal boost pressure control for different driving conditions. The 4N14 2.3 L (2,268 cc) engine also uses a VG turbocharger plus a variable diffuser (VD) that uses both variable geometry vanes in the turbine housing and a compressor with variable vanes in the diffuser passage, further improving combustion efficiency.

Within the engine, Mitsubishi used an offset angle crankshaft that reduces friction, therefore noise and vibration, allowing the engine to run smoothly and quietly at all engine speeds.

To meet the requirements of global emissions standards, Mitsubishi developed a new catalyst system that combines a Diesel Oxidation Catalyst (DOC), NOx Trap Catalyst (NTC) and Diesel Particulate Filter (DPF).

== 4N13 ==
=== Specifications ===
Engine type	Inline 4-cylinder, DOHC 16v, MIVEC (intake)
Displacement	1.8 L (1,798 cc)
Bore x Stroke	83 mm × 83.1 mm (3.27 in × 3.27 in)
Compression ratio	14.9:1
Turbocharger	Variable geometry turbocharger with intercooler
Fuel system	Common rail with solenoid injectors
Peak power	110 kW (150 PS) at 4000 rpm 85 kW (116 PS) at 4000 rpm (low power version)
Peak torque	300 N⋅m (221 lb⋅ft) at 2000-3000 rpm

=== Applications ===
- 2010 Mitsubishi ASX (RVR)
- 2010 Mitsubishi Lancer
- 2012 Peugeot 4008
- 2012 Citroën C4 Aircross

== 4N14 ==
=== Specifications ===
Engine type	Inline 4-cylinder, DOHC 16v, MIVEC
Displacement	2.3 L (2,268 cc)
Bore x Stroke	86 mm × 97.6 mm (3.39 in × 3.84 in)
Turbocharger	Variable geometry turbocharger / variable diffuser, intercooler
Fuel system	Common rail with piezo injectors (CRDi)
Peak power	130 kW (177 PS; 174 hp) at 3500 rpm 110 kW (150 PS; 148 hp) at 3500 rpm without MIVEC; 73 kW (99 PS; 98 hp) at 3500 rpm without MIVEC
Peak torque	380 N⋅m (280 lb⋅ft) at 2000 rpm 360 N⋅m (266 lb⋅ft) at 1500-2750 rpm without MIVEC; 200 N⋅m (148 lb⋅ft) at 1000-3500 rpm without MIVEC

=== Applications ===
- Transversal:
  - 2010 Mitsubishi Outlander
  - 2012 Mitsubishi Delica D:5 (without variable timing, 109 kW (148 PS)/360 N⋅m (266 lb⋅ft))
  - 2013 Mitsubishi ASX (with A/T only, without variable timing)
  - 2017 Mitsubishi Eclipse Cross
- Longitudinal:
  - 2019 Mitsubishi L300 (without variable timing, 73 kW (99 PS)/200 N⋅m (148 lb⋅ft))

== 4N15 ==
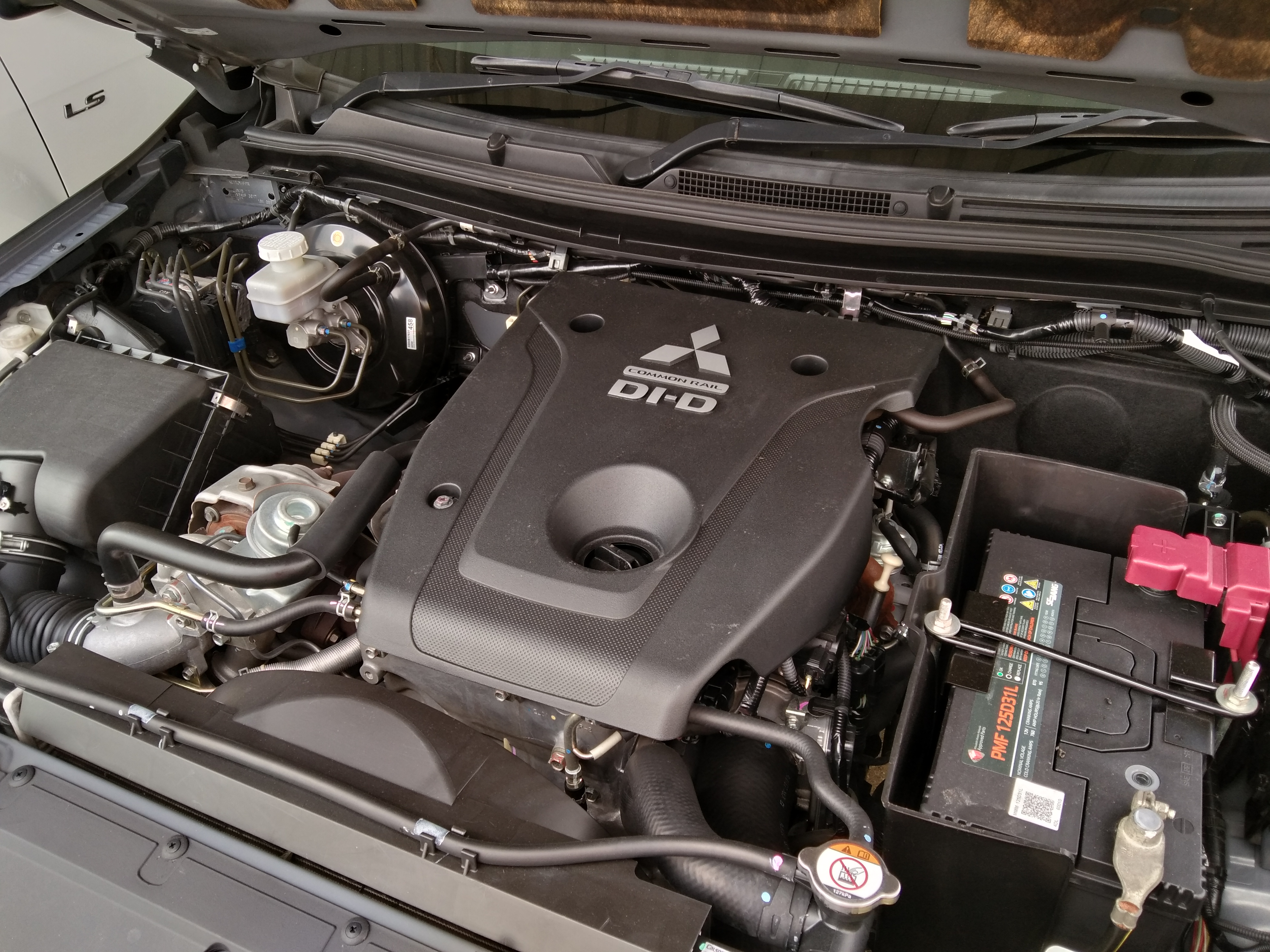
Mitsubishi 4N15 High Power engine

=== Specifications ===
Engine type	Inline 4-cylinder, DOHC 16v, MIVEC
Displacement	2.4 L (2,442 cc)
Bore x Stroke	86 mm × 105.1 mm (3.39 in × 4.14 in)
Compression ratio	15.5:1
Turbocharger	Variable geometry turbocharger / variable diffuser, intercooler
Fuel system	Common rail with electromagnetic solenoid injectors
Peak power	133 kW (181 PS) at 3,500 rpm 113 kW (154 PS) (low power version)
Peak torque	430 N⋅m (317 lb⋅ft) at 2,500 rpm 380 N⋅m (280 lb⋅ft) at 1,500-2,500 rpm (low power version)

=== Applications ===
- 2014 Fiat Fullback
- 2014 Mitsubishi Type 73 light truck
- 2015 Mitsubishi Triton/L200/Strada
- 2015 Mitsubishi Pajero Sport/Montero Sport/Shogun Sport

== 4N16 ==
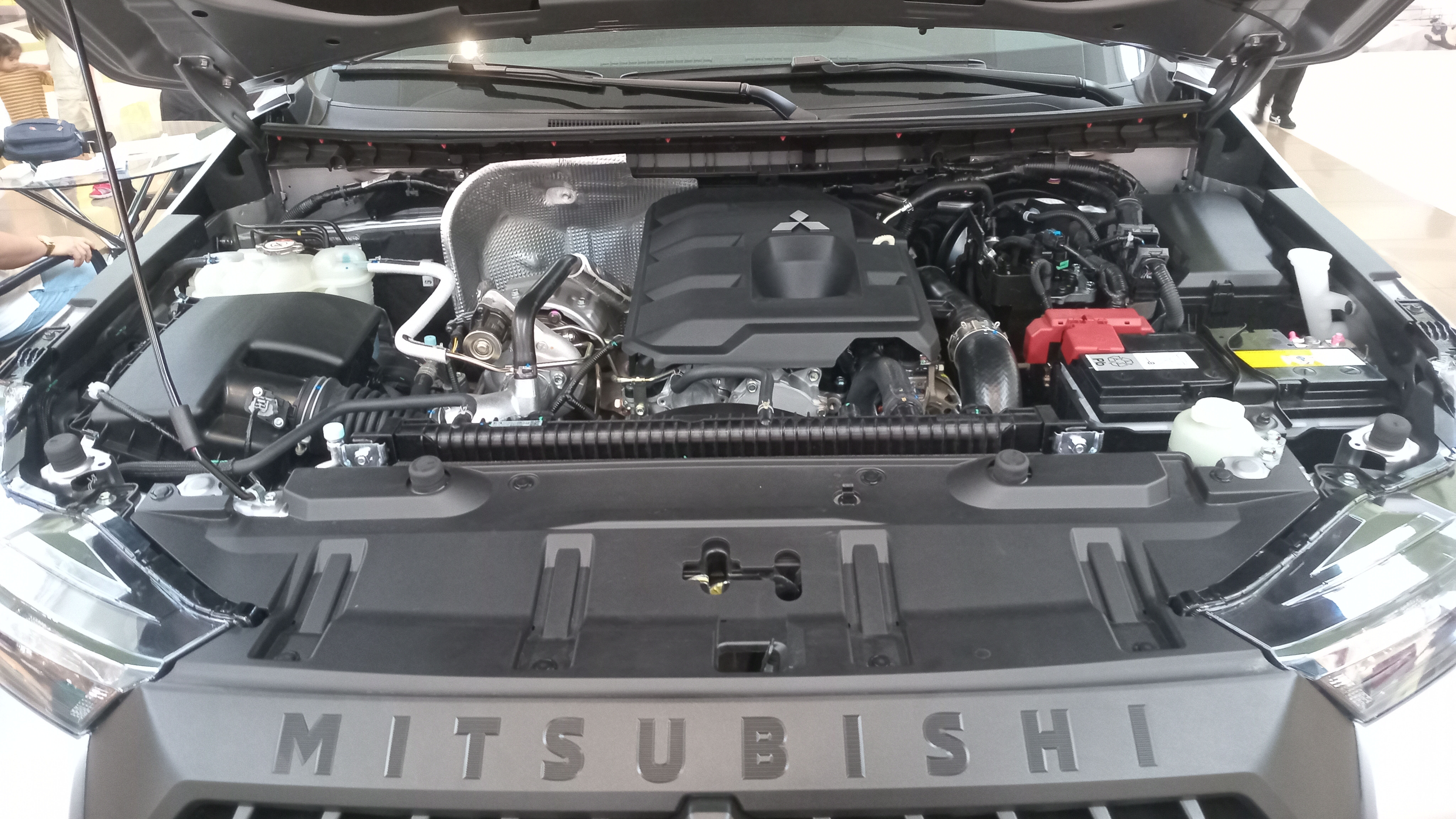
Mitsubishi 4N16 high-power engine

=== Specifications ===
Engine type	Inline 4-cylinder, DOHC 16v, MIVEC
Displacement	2.4 L (2,442 cc)
Bore x Stroke	86 mm × 105.1 mm (3.39 in × 4.14 in)
Compression ratio	15.1–15.2:1
Turbocharger	Variable geometry turbocharger / variable diffuser, intercooler
Fuel system	Common rail
Peak power	150 kW (204 PS) at 3,500 rpm (Bi-Turbo Sequential); 135–150 kW (184–204 PS) at 3,500 rpm 110 kW (150 PS) at 3,500 rpm 97 kW (132 PS) at 3,250 rpm (Nissan Caravan/Isuzu Como)
Peak torque	470 N⋅m (347 lb⋅ft) at 1,500-2,750 rpm (Bi-Turbo Sequential); 430–480 N⋅m (317–354 lb⋅ft) at 2,250-2,500 rpm 330 N⋅m (243 lb⋅ft) at 1,500-3,000 rpm 370 N⋅m (273 lb⋅ft) at 2,000 rpm (Nissan Caravan/Isuzu Como)

=== Applications ===
- 2022 Nissan Caravan/Isuzu Como
- 2023 Mitsubishi Triton/L200
  - 2026 Nissan Navara
- 2024 Mitsubishi Pajero Sport
- 2026 Mitsubishi Pajero

== See also ==
- List of Mitsubishi engines
