= Omer Halilhodžić =

Bosnian automotive designer (born 1963)

- Born: 1963 (age 62–63); Mostar, SFR Yugoslavia (now Bosnia and Herzegovina)
- Education: University of Sarajevo
- Occupation: Automotive designer
- Years active: 1989–present
- Employers: Volkswagen (1991–1995; 2021–present); Škoda Auto (2011–2021); Ferrari (2011); Daimler AG (2008–2011); Mitsubishi Motors (1995–2008)

Omer Halilhodžić (born 1963) is a Bosnian automotive designer.

== Early life and education ==
Halilhodžić was born in 1963 in Mostar, a city in what was then Yugoslavia, but is today located in Bosnia and Herzegovina.

He is a graduate of the University of Sarajevo, graduating with a degree in industrial design in 1989.

== Career ==
Halilhodžić began his career at the local Herzegovina Auto in 1989. In 1991, he began working for Volkswagen before leaving them in 1995 to work for Mitsubishi Motors. He remained with Mitsubishi until 2008, when he joined Mercedes-Benz as the chief exterior designer for their European styling centre in Germany. Subsequently he joined as a member of the design team of Ferrari, contributing to the design of the F12berlinetta and LaFerrari. Around 2011, he began working as an exterior designer and creative design consultant for the design team of Škoda. In 2021, he re-joined Volkswagen as a member of their design team.

== Notable works ==
He was responsible for the styling of the 2004 Mitsubishi Colt, and the concept cars that preceded it: the CZ2, the CZ3, the CZ3 Cabriolet, and the CZT. He has since penned the Mitsubishi Concept Sportback, and the Mitsubishi Concept X, which presages the Mitsubishi Lancer Evolution X that entered production in 2007 (discontinued in May 2016). At Škoda, Halilhodžić was responsible for the design of the brand's first electric car, the Enyaq and contributed in designing the Superb and Kodiaq.

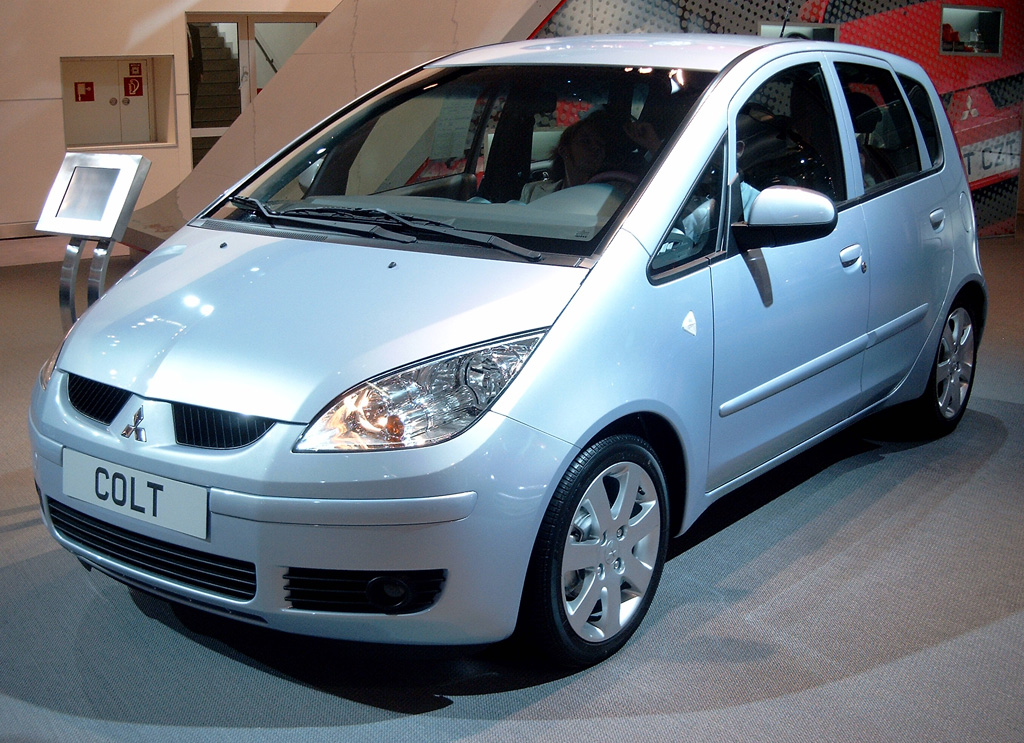
Mitsubishi Colt

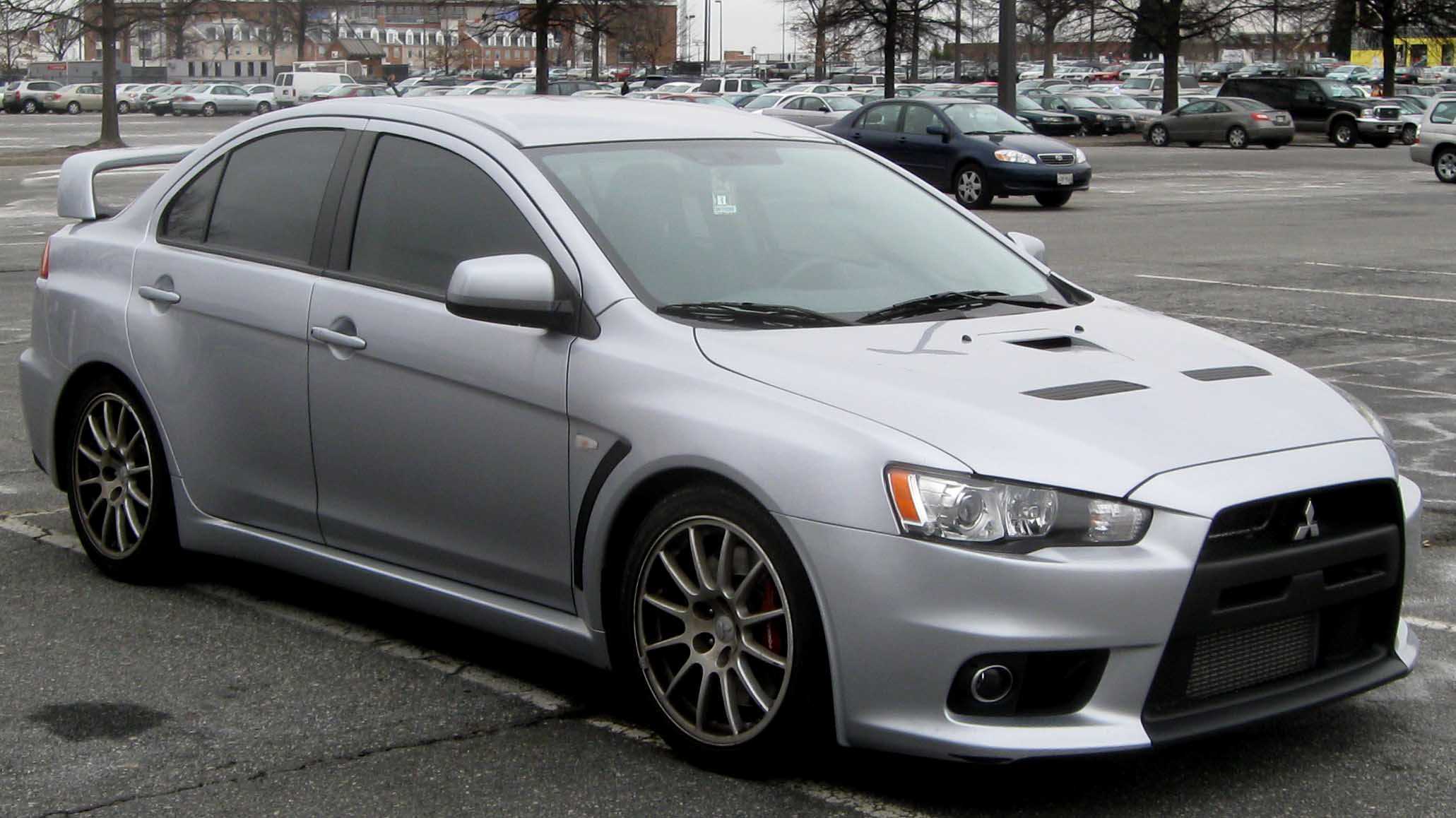
Mitsubishi Lancer

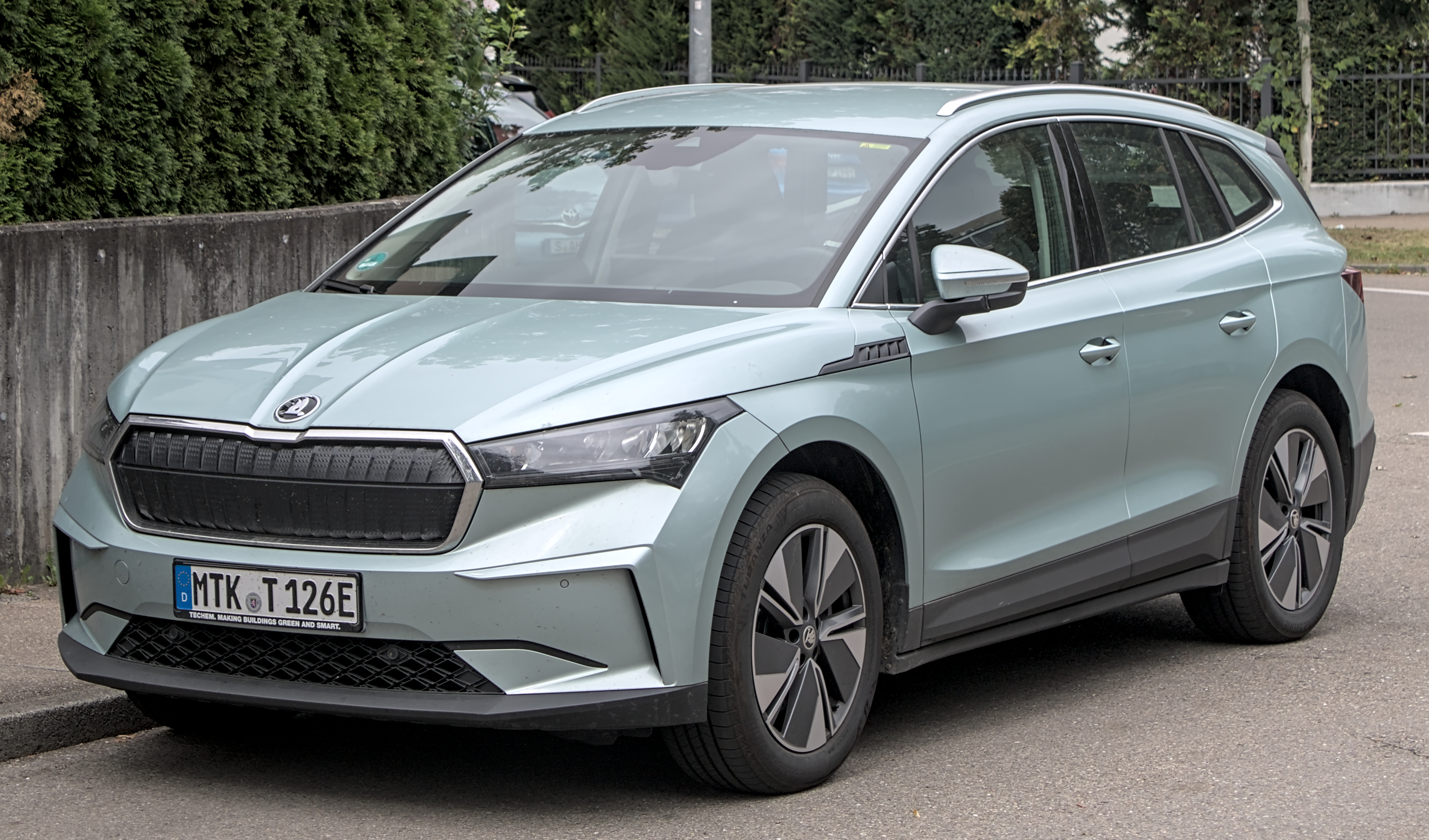
Škoda Enyaq

== Personal life ==
Halilhodžić is married and has a son.

He considers Leonardo da Vinci to be the greatest designer of all time, and looks to nature for inspiration for his creative work.
