= Mitsubishi AWC =

Four-wheel drive system developed by Mitsubishi Motors

Mitsubishi's AWC logo

All Wheel Control (AWC) is the brand name of a four-wheel drive (4WD) system developed by Mitsubishi Motors. The system was first incorporated in the 2001 Lancer Evolution VII. Subsequent developments have led to S-AWC (Super All Wheel Control), developed specifically for the new 2007 Lancer Evolution. The system is referred by the company as its unique 4-wheel drive technology umbrella, cultivated through its motor sports activities and long history in rallying spanning almost half a century.

AWC itself is the implementation of Mitsubishi's AWC philosophy, and the core of AWC is integrated in the form of Mitsubishi's various proprietary technologies, such as 4WD drivetrains, suspension technologies, braking systems, stability/traction control systems, and various differentials. Although initially developed for high performance Lancer Evolution full-time four-wheel drive models, the system is now incorporated in Mitsubishi's other 4WD vehicles, each having its own distinct configuration.

== History ==
=== Dynamic Four, Dynamic ECS, Active TCL ===
In line with this development philosophy, Mitsubishi developed its first high performance four-wheel drive vehicle in 1987, when it equipped the Galant VR-4 with "Dynamic Four", which featured a center differential-type full-time four-wheel drive system (this system incorporated a viscous coupling unit), a four wheel steering system, four-wheel independent suspension, and a four-wheel ABS (the first total integration of these systems in the world that were highly advanced at the time). The 1987 Galant also featured "Dynamic ECS", a semi-active electronically controlled air suspension system (a means of actively controlling a vehicle's cornering attitude and dynamic performance) that Mitsubishi developed. Mitsubishi's active ECS enhanced ride comfort and kept body inclination to a minimum under all driving conditions by controlling the grip between the tires and the road surface. The Galant won the 1987–1988 Japan Car of the Year, the country's most prestigious automotive award. The Dynamic-Four system was honored by the Japan Society for the Promotion of Machine Industry (JSPMI).

In 1990, Mitsubishi released the Diamante (Sigma) in Japan and the Mitsubishi 3000GT, and the limousine Mitsubishi Debonair in 1992. They featured a new electronically controlled active trace & traction control system (the first integration of these two systems in the world) that Mitsubishi developed. Simply named TCL in 1990, the system has now evolved into Mitsubishi's modern Active Skid and Traction Control (ASTC) system. Developed to help the driver maintain the intended line through a corner; an onboard computer monitored several vehicle operating parameters through various sensors. When too much throttle has been used when taking a curve, engine output and braking are automatically regulated to ensure the proper line through a curve and to provide the proper amount of traction under various road surface conditions. While conventional traction control systems at the time featured only a slip control function, Mitsubishi's newly developed TCL system had a preventive (active) safety function which improved the course tracing performance by automatically adjusting the traction force (called "trace control") thereby restraining the development of excessive lateral acceleration while turning. Although not a ‘proper’ modern stability control system, trace control monitors steering angle, throttle position and individual wheel speeds although there is no yaw input. The TCL system's standard wheel slip control function enables better traction on slippery surfaces or during cornering. In addition to the TCL system's individual effect, it also works together with Diamante's electronic controlled suspension and four-wheel steering that Mitsubishi had equipped to improve total handling and performance. The Diamante won the Car of the Year Japan award in 1990–1991.

=== Birth of the AWC system ===
In 1996, Mitsubishi equipped the Lancer Evolution IV with the world's first Active Yaw Control (AYC) system. The AYC transfers drive torque between the left and right drive wheels as required. This was achieved by utilising a torque transfer rear differential which is controlled by various sensors and an electronic control unit (ECU) to enable a difference in torque to go to each of the rear wheels. The result is an improvement in cornering performance and safety compared to most purely mechanical limited slip rear differentials. The eighth generation Galant/Legnum VR-4 model was released for the Japanese market in 1996 that also featured the AYC system, in addition integrated to now fully evolved active stability control (ASC) system. The ASC generates turning force by employing braking force differentials in left and right wheels. The AYC and ASC integrated system maximizes the adhesion limits of the vehicle's tires. Controlling each wheel interdependently, AYC and ASC worked together to improve both safety and performance. The eighth generation Galant won the Car of the Year Japan award in 1996–1997.

In 2001, Mitsubishi equipped the Lancer Evolution VII with the AYC system, Mitsubishi's own Sports ABS and a newly developed Active Center Differential (ACD), which used an electronically controlled variable multi-plate clutch. The ACD has a differential limiting capacity three times greater than that of the viscous coupling-type differential used to date. Also, the ACD's ability to tailor slippage for different driving conditions enabled the levels of steering response and traction control not possible with a viscous coupling differential. In addition, a three-way manual override switch enables the driver to select tarmac, gravel or snow modes to suit his preferences or driving conditions. The ACD also frees the differential on operation of the hand brake, allowing the driver to make more effective use of side brake turns in rallies and gymkhanas. On the Evolution VII, control of the ACD and AYC systems is integrated for the very first time (integrated management of these systems is the core of Mitsubishi's AWC philosophy). In the integrated system, ACD feedback and feedforward information is transmitted to the AYC control system using parameters in such a way that the larger the ACD differential limiting force is, the larger the yaw moment generated by the AYC system. This integrated control operates so that, for example when accelerating out of a corner, the ACD enhances traction and the AYC enhances steering response and cornering performance, improving acceleration and handling more than the ACD and AYC systems would if they were operating independently. By doing so, the Lancer Evolution VII heralded the birth of Mitsubishi's AWC technology.

== Current applications ==
According to Mitsubishi, AWC philosophy is put into practice by means of three forms of control:

- The first form of control is control over the four tires’ vertical loading, by means of which each tire is kept in firm contact with the road surface for consistently maximum grip. The vehicle’s basic specifications and its body and suspension technologies are exploited for this purpose.
- The second form of control is control over the four tires’ slip ratios and slip angles (control that is effected over the respective slip ratios and slip angles of the four tires such that the longitudinal and lateral forces produced by each of the four tires are maximized in a balanced manner). An anti-lock braking system (ABS), a traction control (TCL) system, and steering-system control technologies are exploited for this purpose.
- The third form of control is control over the four tires’ force assignment (control that is effected over the distribution of longitudinal forces and lateral forces among the four tires such that the tires are uniformly loaded for well-balanced utilization). Powertrain and braking-system control technologies are exploited for this purpose.

=== Outlander ===
Mitsubishi's AWC philosophy for the second generation Outlander introduced in 2005 combines an electronically controlled four-wheel drive with an Active Skid and Traction Control (ASTC) system. Mitsubishi used an aluminum roof to lower the center of gravity for better handling response. The Outlander is also available with standard front-wheel drive layout that also included the ASTC system. The previous Outlander employed a 50:50 full-time four-wheel drive system using a viscous coupling center differential. Mitsubishi decided to use the AWC system on the new Outlander that offers three vehicle drive modes and proactively reduces the likelihood of wheel slippage.

The driver can use a drive-mode dial on the center console to select “FWD” for best fuel economy; with “4WD Auto” mode selected, the system uses a rear-mounted electronically controlled transfer clutch to automatically and seamlessly route more power to the rear wheels, depending on driving and road surface conditions. The driver can freely change the drive mode at any time. When “4WD Auto” mode is selected, the Outlander's 4WD system always sends some power to the rear wheels, automatically increasing the amount under full throttle acceleration. The coupling transfers up to forty percent of available torque to the rear wheels under full-throttle acceleration, and this is reduced to twenty five percent over 40 miles per hour. At steady cruising speeds, up to fifteen percent of available torque is sent to the rear wheels. At low speeds through tight corners, coupling torque is reduced, providing a smoother feel through the corner.

For driving in particularly challenging conditions, such as snow, the driver can select “4WD Lock” mode. In Lock mode, the system still apportions front and rear torque automatically, but enables greater power transfer to the rear wheels. In dry conditions, 4WD Lock mode places priority on performance. More torque is directed to the rear wheels than in 4WD Auto mode to provide greater power off the line, better control when accelerating on snowy or loose surfaces, and enhanced stability at high speeds. Rear wheel torque transfer is increased by 50 percent over the amounts in 4WD Auto mode – meaning up to 60 percent of available torque is sent to the rear wheels under full-throttle acceleration on dry pavement. When in 4WD Lock mode, torque at the rear wheels is reduced by a smaller degree through corners than with 4WD Auto mode.

The new Outlander features standard ASTC system on all models, unlike the previous-generation. ASTC helps to prevent side slipping (spin and side drift) as a result of sudden steering wheel operation or on slippery roads. Overall vehicle stability is enhanced in all driving conditions. In front-wheel drive Outlander models – and under all driving modes in four-wheel drive models – ASTC helps keep the vehicle traveling in the driver's intended direction. The ASTC system takes data input from a number of sensors, including steering angle, individual wheel speed and yaw, as well as from the powertrain electronic control unit (ECU). When it detects side-slipping or wheel spin, ASTC provides integrated control of brakes, engine torque (via the electronic throttle control), transmission and electronically controlled four-wheel drive to improve vehicle stability.

=== Delica ===
The 2007 Delica D:5 uses the same electronically controlled four-wheel drive system that is used on the new Outlander, which tailors front and rear wheel torque split to the driving conditions. Delica also features the same selector dial next to the shift selector that allows the driver to switch between three drive modes: 2WD, 4WD AUTO and 4WD LOCK. Mitsubishi's skid-preventing Active Stability Control (ASC) system is also present. Mitsubishi has refined the Delica's four-wheel drive management software from the Outlander by increasing the proportion of torque directed to the rear wheels during uphill driving and reducing it during smaller steering maneuvers in 4WD mode because of the vehicle's difference in wheelbase and weight compared to the Outlander. The results are better hill-climbing performance and cornering stability. Also, in LOCK mode the system senses when wheels on the diagonally opposite corners are in danger of spinning without traction during vehicle operation at low speeds. By activating the brake traction control function at lower speeds than the system in the Outlander, Mitsubishi improved the vehicle's all-terrain performance at low speeds.

=== Lancer ===
The Lancer model 2012 in North America is available with the AWC system. It was first introduced in 2012 on the Lancer SE and for 2013, it is available on both the SE and the GT models ("SE" in North America, both "SE" and "GT"(since 2014/2015) in Canada). The Lancer AWC models are equipped with a CVT (Continuously Variable Transmission) and the GT has paddle shifters simulating 6 speeds. They have the 2.4 liter Mivec engine producing 168 bhp @ 6000 rpm and 167 lb.ft torque @ 4100 rpm.

=== Lancer Evolution ===
The Lancer Evolution IX introduced in 2005 features an electronically controlled full-time four wheel drive system, which incorporates Super AYC, ACD and Sport ABS. The Super AYC is an improved version of the AYC system first introduced on the Lancer Evolution IV. Compared to the previous system it now uses a planetary gear differential that can transfer almost twice the torque between the rear wheels. Lancer Evolution IX also uses a revised AWC system that is even more pro-active than in previous generations. On the Evo VIII, the AWC system gave priority to the Sport ABS system in order to stabilise the car under heavy braking. The ACD and Super AYC modules were effectively disengaged. The AWC system has been revised so that the driving force is still controlled actively, even when the Sports ABS is operational. Through a series of high-speed bends, for example, the system will continue to control the yaw moment of the car, even if the driver is applying braking force. The car's agility and stability are both improved, and the car responds more accurately to steering input on the entry to a corner.

According to Mitsubishi, the Lancer Evolution uses its four-wheel drive system to improve the handling, rather than simply to increase traction. Super AYC acts like a limited slip differential to optimise the Lancer's handling during hard driving. It improves cornering performance by transferring torque between the rear wheels. It also works harmoniously with the ACD, which was introduced on the Evolution VII. Mitsubishi's Sports ABS system is used to enhance the steering control during hard driving. The Sport ABS ECU uses inputs from steering angle, lateral G and vehicle speed sensors to individually apportion braking pressure to each of the four wheels.

=== Pajero ===
The fourth generation Pajero launched in 2006 employs a Super Select 4WD II four-wheel driveline from the previous model which offers four drive modes (2H, 4H, 4HLc, 4LLc) and delivers optimum traction to increase stability and handling characteristics over all surfaces. Pajero also features an upgraded version of Mitsubishi's Active Stability & Traction Control (ASTC) system that can accommodate the installation of a new rear differential lock. Pajero is also equipped with Mitsubishi's Engine Brake Assist Control (EBAC), Multi-Mode Anti-lock Braking System (ABS), Electronic Brakeforce Distribution (EBD), Hill Hold Assist and with Mitsubishi Body Optimised Suspension (MBOS).

SS4-II allows the driver to lock the center differential for maximum drive torque over poor surfaces. The driver can also allow the viscous coupling type center differential to automatically tailor its basic 33:67 F-R torque split to suit different surfaces and conditions. In 2H mode, the road friction losses are minimized to allow maximum fuel economy and is also the ideal mode for urban driving in fine weather. The standard operating mode for SS4 II is the 4H mode which caters to a wide range of conditions: driving around town, on expressways or country roads; and driving over packed snow, icy surfaces, flat dirt and other off-road conditions. Selecting 4HLc mode locks the center differential so that drive is transmitted through all four wheels to enable driving in soft snow, sand, dirt or other high-resistance conditions. The 4LLc mode locks the center differential and by keeping the transmission in a low gear it enables driving on rocky terrains or swampy conditions where extra drive is required.

Available on all models as a factory-fitted option is a rear differential lock that eliminates the differential between the rear wheels. Working hand-in-hand with the front/rear center differential lockup this new feature helps the driver extract his vehicle when bogged down in soft surfaces. Refining improvements have been made to Mitsubishi's ASTC system that regulates brake force and drive torque on an individual wheel basis to deliver better handling and vehicle stability on all surfaces. The ASTC system is now capable of detecting the operating status of the rear differential lock. This allows both systems to be installed at the same time and thereby extending Pajero's off-road capabilities even further.
