= Twin Clutch SST =

Transmission developed by Mitsubishi

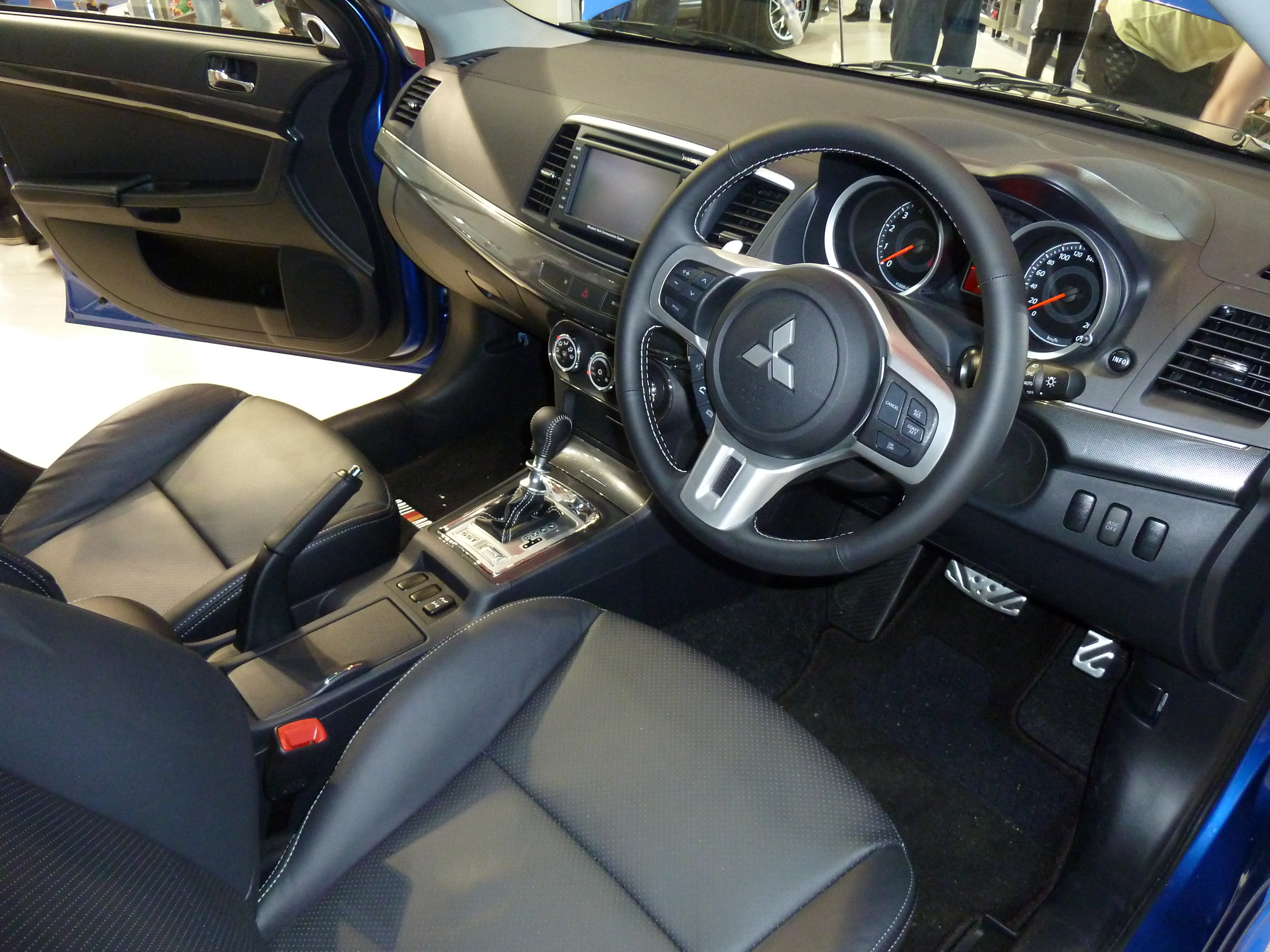

Twin Clutch SST (Sport- or Sportronic Shift Transmission) is the brand name of a six-speed dual-clutch automatic transmission, developed by Getrag for Mitsubishi Motors. The system was first incorporated in the 2008 Lancer Evolution X, and was designed to be a more performance-oriented system than that developed by rival manufacturers, with shorter gear ratios optimized for acceleration.

== Operation ==
TC-SST uses dual-clutches to change gears. The TC-SST completes the clutch and gear shifts more quickly than a driver could in a conventional manual transmission, and is also quicker than either an automatic transmission with a torque converter, or a single-clutch automated manual transmission. The system's high-efficiency power transmission mechanism is on par with a normal manual gearbox while allowing quicker gear shifting with no drop-off in engine power, thus offering greater performance and better fuel economy. The system can be operated by both a console-mounted shifter and magnesium steering wheel paddle shifters; and offers semi-manual and fully automatic modes. TC-SST also works in conjunction with Mitsubishi's S-AWC system.

The operation of TC-SST is smoother than that of a conventional automatic transmission because it uses clutches instead of a torque converter to transmit power. The key to the system's operation is in the electronic and hydraulic controls. TC-SST can select two gears at the same time by putting odd (1st, 3rd, 5th) and even (2nd, 4th, and 6th) gears on separate input shafts, each connected to an individual clutch. While one gear is engaged by one of the two electro-hydraulically operated wet multi-plate clutches, the other is pre-selected, waiting to be engaged by the second wet multi-plate clutch. The TC-SST, in principle, behaves like two three-speed manual transmissions operating on the same output shaft. With both clutches under precise system control, the gear change is made when the clutches are "swapped" simultaneously, allowing fast, smooth gear changes with no interruption in power delivery. Nevertheless, those who prefer the traditional "stick shift" have criticized the level of driver involvement in TC-SST and other dual-clutch transmissions.

The odd and even gear shafts are linked via a transfer gear, resulting in a shorter overall transmission length. The transmission electronic control unit (ECU), sensors, and solenoids, are all housed within the transmission valve body. The TC-SST is equipped with a transmission oil-cooler, and uses a synthetic fluid, designed for twin-clutch transmissions (see owner's manual).

=== Drive modes ===
TC-SST allows switching between three shifting programmes: "Normal", which uses relatively low engine-speed shift points to deliver conservative shifting biased towards optimized fuel economy; "Sport", for use when driving in the mountains or when engine braking is required; and "S-Sport", which keeps the engine turning at even higher revs compared to "Sport". "Launch control" is also available only in "S-Sport" mode.

Note: "S-Sport" is only available from the factory on Evolution X MR editions and not on the TC-SST found in later Lancer Ralliart models, which makes do with Normal and Sport modes. Towards the end of 2012, however, aftermarket car tuners figured out how to successfully flash/reflash (see Chip tuning for details) the Lancer Ralliart's Transmission control unit with the Evolution X MR's transmission software, giving the Lancer Ralliart "S-Sport mode", which includes higher RPM engine operation and launch control. Debate still exists, however, regarding whether or not the different 5th and 6th gear ratios found in the Ralliart transmission (when compared to the Evo X MR TC-SST, see gear ratios below) adds extra mechanical stress to an "S-Sport Mode" flashed Ralliart Transmission.

=== Gear ratios for Lancer Evolution X MR ===
1st	2nd	3rd	4th	5th	6th	final
3.655	2.368	1.754	1.322	1.008	0.775	4.065

(Source: "2008 Mitsubishi Lancer Evo MR: TC-SST Gearing", Brent Romans, Inside Line, August 21, 2008)

=== Gear ratios for Lancer Ralliart ===
1st	2nd	3rd	4th	5th	6th	final
3.655	2.368	1.754	1.322	0.983	0.731	4.062

(Source: "2014 Mitsubishi Lancer-Ralliart Specifications")

== Applications ==
- Mitsubishi Lancer Ralliart
- Mitsubishi Lancer Evolution X
- Mitsubishi Outlander / Citroën C-Crosser / Peugeot 4007
