= Mitsubishi S-AWC =

Four-wheel drive system developed by Mitsubishi Motors

Mitsubishi's S-AWC logo

S-AWC (Super All Wheel Control) is the brand name of an advanced full-time four-wheel drive system developed by Mitsubishi Motors. The technology, specifically developed for the new 2007 Lancer Evolution, the 2010 Outlander (if equipped), the 2014 Outlander (if equipped), the Outlander PHEV and the Eclipse Cross have an advanced version of Mitsubishi's AWC system. Mitsubishi Motors first exhibited S-AWC integration control technology in the Concept-X model at the 39th Tokyo Motor Show in 2005. According to Mitsubishi, "the ultimate embodiment of the company's AWC philosophy is the S-AWC system, a 4WD-based integrated vehicle dynamics control system".

It integrates management of its Active Center Differential (ACD), Active Yaw Control (AYC), Active Stability Control (ASC), and Sports ABS components, while adding braking force control to Mitsubishi's own AYC system, allowing regulation of torque and braking force at each wheel. S-AWC employs yaw rate feedback control, a direct yaw moment control technology that affects left-right torque vectoring (this technology forms the core of S-AWC system) and controls cornering maneuvers as desired during acceleration, steady state driving, and deceleration. Mitsubishi claims the result is elevated drive power, cornering performance, and vehicle stability regardless of driving conditions.

== Components ==
=== Active Center Differential (ACD) ===
Active Center Differential incorporates an electronically-controlled hydraulic multi-plate clutch. The system optimizes clutch cover clamp load for different driving conditions, regulating the differential limiting action between free and locked states to optimize front/rear wheel torque split and thereby producing the best balance between traction and steering response.

=== Active Yaw Control (AYC) ===
Active Yaw Control uses a torque transfer mechanism in the rear differential to control rear wheel torque differential for different driving conditions and so limit the yaw moment that acts on the vehicle body and enhance cornering performance. AYC also acts like a limited-slip differential by suppressing rear wheel slip to improve traction. In its latest form, AYC now features yaw rate feedback control using a yaw rate sensor and also gains braking force control. Accurately determining the cornering dynamics on a realtime basis, the system operates to control vehicle behavior through corners and realize vehicle behavior that more closely mirrors driver intent.

=== Active Stability Control (ASC) ===
Active Stability Control (ASC) takes vehicle stability to new heights by ensuring optimal traction and stabilizing the vehicle's attitude. This system achieves these feats through meticulous regulation of engine power and braking force at each wheel. Building upon the advancements of the earlier Lancer Evolution model, the integration of brake pressure sensors at each wheel enhances control precision, allowing for more accurate modulation of braking force. ASC's contribution is particularly evident in its capacity to enhance traction during acceleration, effectively preventing wheel spin on slippery surfaces and further solidifying the vehicle's stability. It also elevates vehicle stability by suppressing skidding in an emergency evasive maneuver or the result of other sudden steering inputs.

=== Sport ABS ===
The Sports ABS system supports braking when entering into a corner by controlling power to all tires depending on handling characteristics. Braking can be controlled to obtain optimal damping at each tyre based on information from four wheel-speed sensors and steering wheel angle sensor. The addition of yaw rate sensors and brake pressure sensors to the Sport ABS system has improved braking performance through corners compared to the Lancer Evolution IX.

== Concept components for 2007 Lancer Evolution ==
The prototype system also featured two additional components controlling suspensions and steering, which failed to make the production version of S-AWC system:

=== Active Steering System ===
Active Steering System realizes handling with more linear response by adaptively controlling front wheel turn angle according to steering input and vehicle speed. At slower vehicle speeds the system improves response by shifting to a quicker steering gear ratio, while at higher speeds it substantially improves stability by moving to a slower gear ratio. For rapid steering inputs, S-AWC momentarily increases front wheel turn angle and Super AYC control to realize sharper response. In countersteer situations, S-AWC increases responsiveness further to assist the driver with steering precision.

=== Roll Control Suspension (RCS) ===
RCS effectively reduces body roll and pitching by hydraulically connecting all the shock absorbers together and regulating their damping pressures as necessary. Able to control both roll and pitching stiffness separately, RCS can operate in a variety of ways. It can, for example, reduce roll only when required during turn in or in other situations while being set up on the soft side to prioritize tire contact and ride comfort. Since the system controls roll stiffness hydraulically, it eliminates the need for stabilizer bars. In the integrated control of its component systems, S-AWC employs information from RCS's hydraulic system to estimate the tire load at each wheel.

== Control system ==
The use of engine torque and brake pressure information in the regulation of the ACD and AYC components allows the S-AWC system to determine more quickly whether the vehicle is accelerating or decelerating. S-AWC also employs yaw rate feedback for the first time. The system helps the driver follow his chosen line more closely by comparing how the car is running, as determined from data from the yaw rate sensors, and how the driver wants it to behave, as determined from steering inputs, and operates accordingly to correct any divergence. The addition of braking force regulation to AYC's main role of transferring torque between the right and left wheels allows S-AWC to exert more control over vehicle behavior in on-the-limit driving situations. Increasing braking force on the inside wheel during understeer and on the outer wheel during oversteer situations, AYC's new braking force control feature works in conjunction with torque transfer regulation to realize higher levels of cornering performance and vehicle stability.

Using integrated management of the ASC and ABS systems allows S-AWC to effectively and seamlessly control vehicle dynamics when accelerating, decelerating or cornering under all driving conditions. S-AWC offers three operating modes:

- Tarmac for dry, paved surfaces;
- Gravel for wet or unmade surfaces;
- Snow for snow-covered surfaces.

When the driver selects the mode best suited to current road surface conditions S-AWC operates to control vehicle behavior accordingly and allow the driver to extract the maximum dynamic performance from his vehicle.

=== ECU integration ===
Two electronic control units (ECU) regulate vehicle motion. One is an ECU developed by Mitsubishi Electric to control ACD and AYC. The other is an ECU developed by Continental Automotive Systems of Germany that controls ASC and ABS. The two ECUs can communicate with other ECUs through a CAN, an in-vehicle LAN interface standard. In addition, the two ECUs are communicating with each other through a dedicated CAN, enabling vehicle motion to be controlled more quickly. The cable and communication standard for the dedicated CAN are the same as those for other CANs.

A longitudinal acceleration sensor, lateral acceleration sensor and yaw rate sensor are installed as one module near the gravity center of a vehicle, which is located between the driver's and passenger's seats. Other sensors, such as a wheel-speed sensor and steering-angle sensor, are installed in different places. However, no vertical acceleration sensor is used.

Also, when the vehicle is equipped with Mitsubishi's Twin Clutch SST transmission, S-AWC analyzes the behavior of the turning vehicle and if it judges that it is safer not to shift gears, it sends a signal to tell Twin Clutch SST that the gear must not be changed. However, S-AWC does not control vehicle motion by using control information from Twin Clutch SST. The co-operation is a one-way communication.

The control algorithms of vehicle motion were developed by Mitsubishi in-house, with MATLAB and Simulink: control system modeling tools. Mitsubishi adopted model-based method, which combines an algorithm and physical model of a vehicle to run a simulation. The physical model of a vehicle was constructed with CarSim, a simulation-package software developed by Mechanical Simulation Corporation (acquired by Applied Intuition) of the United States. The algorithms were developed for each function such as ACD and AYC, not for each vehicle type. Therefore, the algorithms can be employed by various types of vehicles.

== Concept components for 2010 Outlander ==
The 2010MY Outlander adopts a new S-AWC (Super All Wheel Control) that has added and refined an active front differential that controls the differential limiting force of the left and right front wheels based on an electronically controlled 4WD that distributes drive force to the rear wheels and integrates this Active Stability Control (ASC) and ABS. The result is greater turning performance, stability and drive performance while maintaining fuel economy equal to traditional electronically controlled 4WD.

=== Structure ===
The S-AWC ECU calculates the amount of control according to drive condition and vehicle behavior based on sensor and switch data and ECU operation data. Control instructions are sent to the active front diff and electronic control couplings.

=== Active control differential ===
Electronically controlled couplings used in electronic –control 4WD are located in the transfer case to limit differential between the front left and right wheels and control drive force distribution on either side.

=== Electronic control coupling ===
An electronic control coupling within the rear differential distributes drive force to the rear wheels according to driving conditions. This is the same as used for 4WD electronic control in the 2009 model Outlander.

=== S-AWC ECU ===
The optimal amount of drive force control is calculated from sensor information obtained from CAN communications etc. to control the active front diff and the electronically controlled coupling. Compared with the 2009 Outlander, Microcomputer performance has been enhanced and calculation speed and accuracy have been improved.

=== Sensor information ===
Compared with electronically controlled 4WD, sensor information has been significantly augmented to accurately assess vehicle driving conditions and realize highly-responsive, finely tuned control.

=== S-AWC control mode switch ===
S-AWC in the 2010 model Outlander has three selectable modes of control (NORMAL/SNOW/OFFROAD) that have been tuned to suit the road surface. Making the switch according to road surface conditions enables proper control.

=== Indicator ===
S-AWC control information will be constantly displayed on the upper level of the multi-information display. A dedicated screen has been provided to display S-AWC operation information. The center displays traction control condition while yaw movement control conditions are displayed on either side.

=== Control ===
Changes to the 2009 Outlander's electronically controlled 4WD.

1) Addition of integrated control with the active front differential

In addition to front and rear drive force distribution, enabling integrated control of drive force distribution to both front wheels delivers a higher level of driving on all fronts (turning performance, stability and road performance) compared with the 2009 Outlander.

2) Introduction of a yaw rate feedback control

Vehicle behavior faithful to drive input is realized by precise assessment of vehicle turning movement based on yaw rate sensor data and the provision of achieve close to target vehicle behavior obtained from speed and steering angle.

3) Evolution of coordinated ASC/ABS control

Properly controlling active front differential and electronically controlled coupling according to the operating status of ASC and ABS, improves turning performance and stability.

== Concept components for 2014 Outlander ==
The following functions have been recently added.

=== Brake control ===
When the under steer condition, the beginning of turning response by steering operation

is dramatically improved by adding the brake force to the inner wheel.

In addition, the wheel slippage is reduced during start moving.

=== EPS control ===
Suppress the steering wheel movement which generated by the slippery road.

As a result, the traction performance improves because the amount of the control of Active Front Differential (AFD) can be increased.

=== Synchronized with ECO MODE ===
By selecting the ECO MODE, Engine and climate control are controlled as an "ECO

mode." Likewise, S-AWC control also turn to AWC ECO.

At the result of this control, the driver can easily engage "ECO mode."

=== Control ===
S-AWC Control Mode

By pushing S-AWC Control switch, the control mode can be changed.

== Concept components for Outlander PHEV ==
=== Fail-safe function ===
Fault detection

The ECU performs the following checks at the appropriate moment. The ECU determines that a fault has occurred when the fault detection conditions are met. Then the ECU stores the diagnosis code and ensures that the vehicle can still be driven. When the failure resume conditions are met, ECU determines the status is normal, and resumes the system. Start-up (Initial check immediately after the power supply mode of the electric motor switch is turned on.)

• CPU check

• Performs the ROM and RAM checks.

Always (while the power supply mode of the electric motor switch is turned on except during initial check)

1. CPU check

• Performs CAN communication and interactive check between CPUs.

2. Power supply check

• Monitors the CPU supply voltage and checks if the voltage is within specifications.

3. External wire connection check

• Checks if the input and output of each external wire connection is open or shorted.

=== 4WD lock switch ===
The 4WD lock switch is located on the floor console. When the 4WD lock switch is pressed with the electric motor switch ON, "4WD LOCK" will be turned on and off. When the 4WD lock switch is turned on with the drive mode at ECO, or the ECO mode switch is turned on with the drive mode at 4WD lock, the drive mode will be switched to "ECO MODE/4WD LOCK". The driver can obtain better ground-covering ability by choosing the drive mode between "4WD LOCK" and "ECO MODE/4WD LOCK". When the ECO mode switch is turned off, the drive mode will return from "ECO MODE/4WD LOCK" to "4WD LOCK."

=== Cornering Performance ===
==== Enhancement of the cornering stability ====
It is optimization of the torque distribution ratio between front and rear wheels when cornering. In order to keep the cornering stability against the direction of steering wheel on the slippery road.

==== Enhancement of the vehicle maneuverability ====
The optimization of the control value for the AYC (Active Yaw Control) with braking, in order to enhance the vehicle maneuverability.

=== Traction performance ===
Launching performance on the icy slope is enhanced.

== Concept components for Eclipse Cross ==
S-AWC (Super All Wheel Control) is an integration of vehicle dynamics control systems whose design goals include safety and comfort.

S-AWC of NEW ECLIPSE CROSS adopted the integration system that controlled with Active Stability Control (ASC) and ABS based on Electronically Controlled 4WD that distributes driving torque to rear wheel and Active Yaw Control (AYC) that controlled drive/braking torque between right and left wheel. The goal of the design is to prevent loss of control while excessive braking or accelerating on slippery roads. AYC of ECLIPSE CROSS controls drive/braking torque between right and left wheel by additional brake force. There are three modes of operation:

- AUTO - This mode achieves adequate 4WD performance on various conditions.
- SNOW - This mode enhances stability on the slippery road surface.
- GRAVEL - This mode excels at rough road driving and escape from stuck conditions.

=== Electronically controlled 4WD ===
An electronically controlled coupling integrated within the rear differential assembly distributes optimum driving forces between the front and rear axles, thus improving acceleration and driving stability.

=== Brake AYC ===
The AWC-ECU is a computer that uses the inputs from various sensors to assess the state of vehicle stability and, if necessary, compensates for an instability by controlling the braking forces of the left and right wheels to generate a yaw moment.

*The EPS is not used to S-AWC control.

=== AWC-ECU Function ===
The main functions of AWC-ECU are as follows:

1. Communication function

- CAN communication with other ECUs (Engine-ECU, CVT-ECU, ASC-ECU, ETACS, EPS-ECU).
- Communication with drive mode selector: The signal from the drive mode selector changes the drive mode.
- Combination meter display: Drive mode is displayed.

2. Coupling control function

- Current output: Differential control function of the electronic control coupling according to the vehicle conditions.

3. ECU self-diagnosis function

- Initial check: ROM check, relay check, etc.
- Recording function of diagnostic trouble codes and freeze frame data in case of failure.
- If a fault occurs, the system will be disabled and a warning icon will be displayed.
- Normal control: Malfunction of CPU power supply, relay check, open or short circuit of the I/O signal, abnormal CAN communication.
