= Our Lady of Light =

Our Lady of Light may refer to:

- "Our Lady of Light" (Portuguese), Nossa Senhora da Luz (disambiguation), a list of places in Cape Verde
- "Our Lady of Light" (Spanish), Nuestra Señora de la Luz (disambiguation), a list of places and churches
- "Our Lady of Light", another name for Our Lady of Zeitoun, a mass Marian apparition that occurred in Cairo, Egypt, for 2 to 3 years beginning in 1968
- Our Lady of Light Cathedral, Guarabira, Paraiba, Brazil
- Our Lady of Light Parish Church, Rizal, Philippines

== See also ==
- Titles of Mary
