= SumBingTik Festival =

Annual Philippines cultural festival

- Also called: Araw ng Cainta (Day of Cainta)
- Observed by: Cainta, Rizal
- Significance: Patronal festival
- Celebrations: The town's delicacies, suman, bibingka, and latik
- Date: December 1
- Frequency: annual

The SumBingTik Festival is an annual cultural festival held on December 1 in Cainta, Rizal. The festival starts on the feast day of Cainta's first patron saint, Saint Andrew the Apostle, on November 30, and continues on the day of the town's founding anniversary and feast of Our Lady of Light, the principal patron saint of the town, which is celebrated on December 1. The festival was first celebrated in 2014.

== Etymology ==
The term "sumbingtik" is a portmanteau of suman, bibingka, and latik, the town's native delicacies.
