= Mitsubishi Montero Sport crash incidents =

Sudden unintended acceleration involving SUV

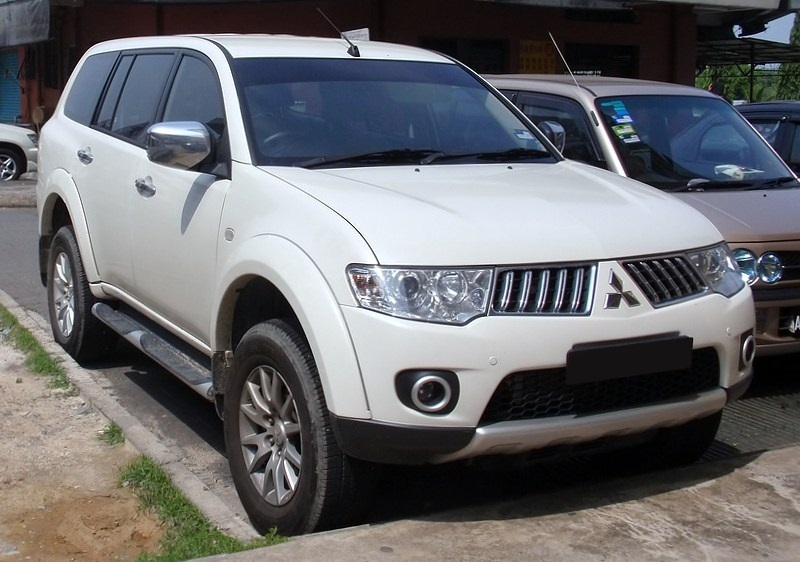
Second generation Mitsubishi Pajero Sport (Montero Sport) in Kota Kinabalu, Malaysia, similar to the car model concerned.

In late 2015, incidents of sudden unintended acceleration (SUA) involving the Mitsubishi Montero Sport have been reported in the Philippines. Concerns regarding the safety of the car model were raised and several class action lawsuits against Mitsubishi Motors Philippines were filed.

Since then, over 100 complaints against Mitsubishi Motors Philippines have been filed by Montero Sport owners. The incident has since been the subject of an investigation by the Department of Trade and Industry (DTI). There are also several sudden unintended acceleration incidents involving 2009 to 2011 Montero that date back to 2010 to 2012. However, no such incidents have surfaced in other countries.

At least 23 SUA incidents involving Montero Sports were recorded by the Philippine National Police Highway Patrol Group, from motorists in Metro Manila, Cavite, Batangas, Iloilo City, Laguna and Tacloban.

Mitsubishi has asserted that the vehicles are safe to use and any sudden acceleration claims were without basis. The company however offered a free inspection for Montero owners affected by the incident.

== Notable incidents ==
- September 13, 2014: During the funeral procession of the remains of former Ilocos Norte vice governor Mariano Nalupta, Jr., a Montero Sport (owned by the bereaved family of Nalupta), suddenly accelerated and struck 13 people who were part of the procession. The incident resulted in two fatalities and injured 11, including board member Ria Christina Fariñas, daughter of Congressman Rodolfo Fariñas.
- July 15, 2015: Bishop Noel Alba Pantoja's wife was nearly killed when the vehicle fell into a 57-foot-deep (17 m) ravine upon accelerating on a dangerous curved road.
- December 6, 2015: A Montero Sport slammed into several concrete barriers on the Skyway Stage 3 construction on Araneta Avenue in Tatalon, Quezon City.
- December 7, 2015: In Iloilo City, an owner of a Montero Sport reported his vehicle suddenly accelerated and rammed into his house's dining room.
- December 21, 2017: ABS-CBN News reporter Doris Bigornia and her cameraman were involved in an accident involving a Montero Sport.
- March 17, 2021: The Land Bank EDSA Congressional Branch in Muñoz, Quezon City was unintentionally rammed by a white Mitsubishi Montero Sport GLS-V driven by Esther Peralta, injuring a bank employee.
- September 18, 2021: A Mister Donut branch in Greenhills, San Juan was rammed by a white Mitsubishi Montero Sport, causing damage to the donut shop and a parked taxi. No injuries were reported.
- January 6, 2022: A silver Mitsubishi Montero Sport crashed into two sedans in the parking lot of Market! Market! in Bonifacio Global City.
- August 9, 2023: Two people were killed after being hit by a driver of a Mitsubishi Montero Sport along Madison Street in Mandaluyong.

== Investigation ==
Initially, the DTI has not ordered any recall of Montero Sport models following its two-week investigation on the alleged SUA incidents. In 2017 the agency has ordered a recall on all automatic transmission variants of the vehicle manufactured between 2010 and 2015, but has since clarified that the recall order was not yet final and executory.

== Other reactions ==
Bayan Muna representatives Neri Colmenares and Carlos Isagani Zarate blamed the incidents on the Department of Trade and Industry's failure to conduct safety inspections on the vehicles in question.

In light of the incidents, Mitsubishi Motors Philippines has asserted that the Montero Sport is safe to use, and any claims of sudden acceleration are devoid of any basis.

Quezon City Rep. Winnie Castelo, the current chairman of Metro Manila development committee urged Mitsubishi Motors to recall all its defective Montero models until the investigation of the DTI have been concluded.

The incident inspired numerous parodies and satirical reactions to SUA cases, one of which is the sardonic term "sudden unintended apak," incorporating the Filipino word apak which means "to step on," insinuating that the incidents had more to do with human error and driver incompetence than a defect in the vehicle.

=== Criticism of media coverage ===
The Center for Media Freedom and Responsibility (CMFR) criticised mainstream news coverage of the incidents for lacking technical expertise and failing to present statements from automotive industry experts. TV Patrol, in particular, was noted for their disproportionate coverage compared to other news programs and newspaper reports, which the CMFR compared unfavorably to the Philippine edition of Top Gear for their lack of authority on the matter.

== See also ==
- 2009–11 Toyota vehicle recalls
