= MNL1 Data Center =

MNL1
Project
- Opening date: 2022
- Construction cost: US$700 million
- Status: Planned
- Developer: JLL Philippines
- Owner: SpaceDC
- Website: spacedc.com

Physical features
- Major buildings: 3 four-storey buildings
- Utilities: 48 x 1,500kW data halls

Location
- Country: Philippines
- Province: Rizal
- Municipality: Cainta

Area
  - Total: 4.3 ha (11 acres)

The MNL1 Data Center is a proposed hyperscale green data center campus to be built in Cainta, Rizal. If built, MNL1 will become the largest data center in the Philippines.

== History ==
Singaporean firm SpaceDC announced in February 2022 that it plans to set up MNL1, a hyperscale data center, in the Philippines citing the country as the second country in Southeast Asia with the fastest data center growth and characterized it as a "dramatically underserved market". It acquired the service of property consulting firm JLL as MNL1's construction manager. At a cost of US$700 million, it is planned to be built in Cainta, Rizal. SpaceDC assessed potential sites in Greater Manila for natural disaster risk such as earthquakes, flooding, and volcanic eruptions prior to settling with the Cainta site.

It is projected to be operational within 2022. If completed it will become the largest data center in the Philippines.

== Facilities ==
The MNL1 campus in Cainta, Rizal will cover an area of 4.3 hectares (11 acres). It will be a green data center with a capacity of 72 MW and mainly powered wind and geothermal energy. It will host its own leading internet exchange as well as switch/ramp to cloud providers such as AWS, Alibaba, and Azure.
