= Sierra Valley Gardens =

Mixed-use development in Cainta, Rizal, Philippines

Project
- Opening date: November 23, 2020
- Developer: Robinsons Land Corporation
- Owner: Robinsons
- Website: Sierra Valley Gardens

Physical features
- Transport: 4 San Juan (future)

Location
- Interactive map of Sierra Valley Gardens
- Coordinates: 14°35′01″N 121°07′57″E
- Location: Barangay San Juan, Cainta, Rizal, Philippines
- Address: Ortigas Avenue Extension (R-5 Road), cor. Suburban Drive, Brgy. San Juan, Cainta 1900 Rizal, Philippines

Area
  - Total: 18 ha (44 acres)

Sierra Valley Gardens is a mixed-use development being developed by Robinsons Land Corporation in Barangay San Juan, Cainta, Rizal, Philippines. Located on the boundary of Cainta and Taytay, the 18-hectare (44-acre) site was formerly a Mitsubishi Motors Philippines Corporation vehicle production plant until 2015, when it transferred its production site to Santa Rosa, Laguna. Sierra Valley Gardens will have its own Cyber Park technological hub and Robinsons Mall. At an approximate 5 hectares, Robinsons Sierra Valley will be the largest shopping mall in Cainta.

== Location ==
Sierra Valley Gardens is located at the corner of Ortigas Avenue Extension (R-5 Road) and Suburban Drive in Barangay San Juan, Cainta, Rizal. After the demolition of the former Mitsubishi plant in 2017, Suburban Drive was realigned and expanded from a two-lane road to a six-lane boulevard. Sierra Valley Gardens serves as a boundary marker between Cainta and Taytay along Ortigas Avenue Extension, and the limiting wall in the commercial strip or also being called as Roadside Store serves as the exact boundary of Cainta, which separates the RLC properties from Panasonic, Security Bank, and Petron Gasoline Station. It is adjacent to the villages of Janssenville Subdivision, Saint Anthony Subdivision, and Valley Golf Executive Village.

== History ==
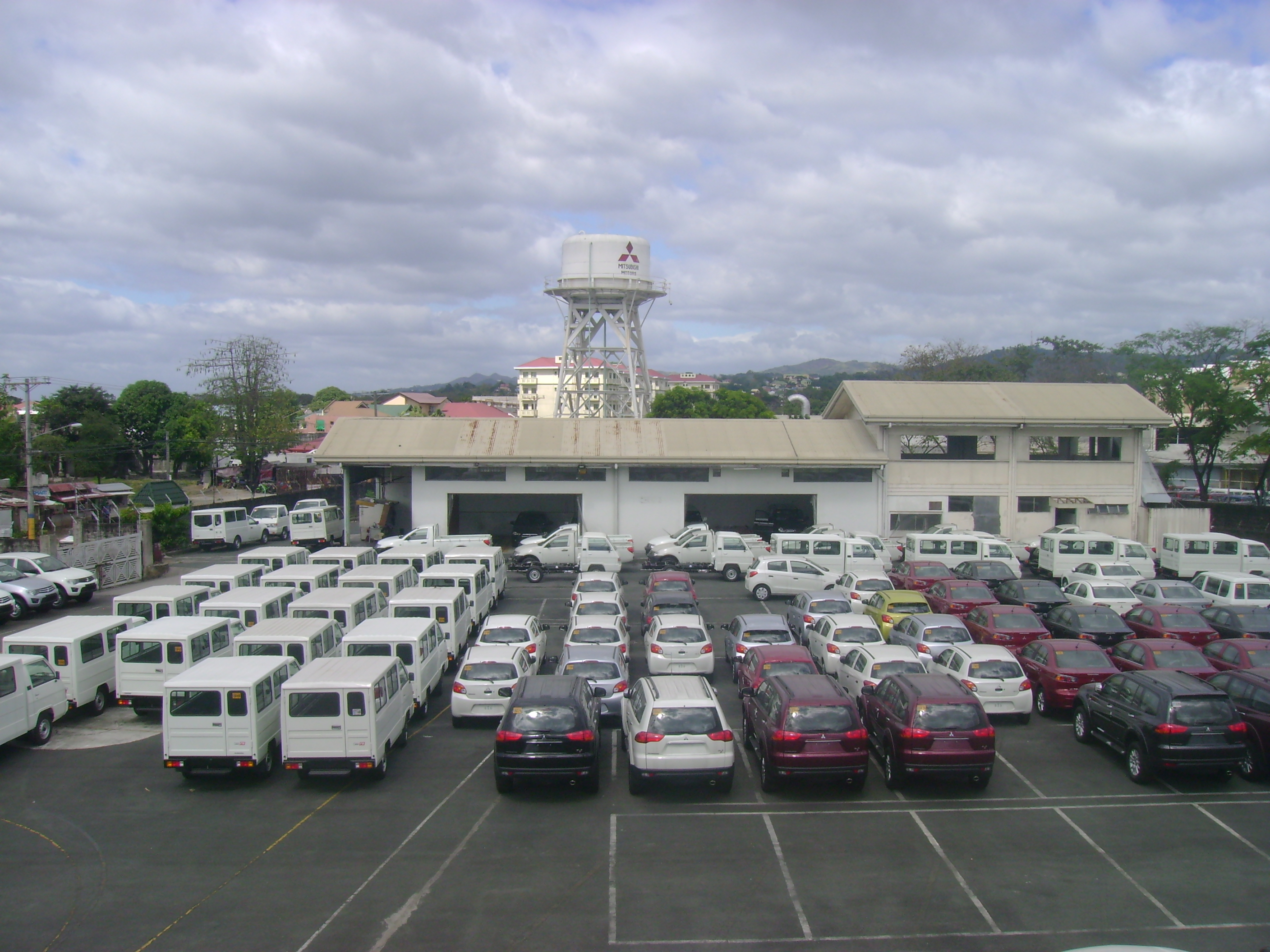
Former Mitsubishi Motors plant in Cainta from 1963 to 2014, before the Mitsubishi Motors Philippines Corporation transferred its production site to Santa Rosa, Laguna in 2015. Which is today a mixed-use development site of Sierra Valley Gardens since 2020, with proposed Cyber Park and Robinsons Sierra Mall.

The site was the first vehicle assembly plant of Mitsubishi Motors Philippines Inc., with operations spanning 51 years from 1963 to 2014. It primarily assembled Mitsubishi models L300 and Adventure before it transferred its production site to Santa Rosa, Laguna in 2015.

On October 27, 2020, the Robinsons Land Corporation opened its showroom on the 2nd floor of nearby Primark Town Center along Ortigas Avenue Extension in Cainta, Rizal.

== Features ==
Sierra Valley Gardens will have condominiums, commercial and office spaces that would cater to those living in Cainta and nearby cities and towns. A commercial strip was opened in 2021, and a business process outsourcing hub will be built to in the hopes of generating job employment for its neighbouring communities' residents and even people from adjacent towns or cities. The estate offers numerous indoor and outdoor amenities, including a three-level clubhouse, function rooms, game room, fitness center and dance studio, work/study area, lap pool, jogging trail, and landscaped areas, among others.
