= Nuestra Señora de la Luz =

Nuestra Señora de la Luz may refer to:

- Mission Nuestra Señora de la Luz comprises a series of religious outposts established by Spanish Catholic Dominicans, Jesuits and Franciscans to spread the Christian doctrine among the local Native Americans, but with the added benefit of giving Spain a toehold in the frontier land.
- Nuestra Señora de la Luz de Tancoyol of the Sierra Gorda in the Mexican state of Querétaro were declared a World Heritage Site by the UNESCO in 2003. They are credited to Junípero Serra of the Franciscan Order, who also founded important missions in Alta California.
- Cainta Church, a church in Cainta, Rizal, Philippines, also known by this name
- Loon Church, a church in Loon, Bohol, Philippines, destroyed by the 2013 Bohol earthquake

== See also ==
- Nossa Senhora da Luz (disambiguation)
