= FEU Roosevelt =

Educational institution in the Philippines

- Former names: Marikina Academy (1933–1944); Roosevelt Memorial High School (1945–1962); Roosevelt College (1962–2019)
- Type: Private, nonsectarian
- Established: 1933; 93 years ago
- President: Juan Miguel R. Montinola
- Senior Vice President: Alma Emerita Dela Cruz
- Campus: Flagship FEU Roosevelt Cainta 35 D Sumulong Hwy, Cainta, Rizal
- Hymn: The FEU Hymn by Nick Joaquin
- Colours: Green and gold
- Nicknames: Tamaraws, Baby Tamaraws
- Mascot: TamTam
- Website: https://feuroosevelt.edu.ph/

FEU Roosevelt, formerly Roosevelt College, is a private, non-sectarian educational institution based in the northeastern area of Metro Manila, Philippines. It became part of the FEU Group of Schools in 2016. FEU Roosevelt offers basic education, high school, and tertiary programs across its three campuses.

== History ==
FEU Roosevelt was established in the city of Marikina in 1933 by former Mayor Wenceslao Dela Paz as the Marikina Academy, making it one of the oldest academic institutions in the area. The academy eventually closed after the death of Dela Paz in 1944.

As part of postwar reconstruction and rehabilitation it was assessed that there was a lack of secondary schools in Marikina. A group of educators, led by Deogracias F. Dela Paz, incorporated the organization and named it Roosevelt Memorial High School (RMHS).

Over the years RMHS has branched out to several locations: San Juan, (Note: No longer existing.) Cubao, San Mateo, and Quirino. As it began to offer tertiary and postgraduate graduate programs, it was renamed Roosevelt College, Inc. (RCI). RCI shifted its focus to systems and management enhancement programs.

=== Acquisition ===
In 2016, the Far Eastern University in Manila acquired the majority of the institution, disclosing to the Philippine Stock Exchange that its board approved acquiring RCI "up to 97.42 percent but no less than 73.99 percent", costing up to ₱1.25 billion. This placed RCI under the roster of the FEU Group of Schools and was later rebranded as FEU Roosevelt in 2019.

== Campuses ==
=== Cainta ===
FEU Roosevelt Cainta was set up in 1974 when Roosevelt Memorial High School was transferred from San Roque in Marikina to the present Sumulong Highway site. Serving as the flagship campus, it offers Basic education as well as undergraduate and post-graduate tertiary programs.

=== Marikina ===
FEU Roosevelt Marikina is the oldest existing campus of the institution. It was built in 1967 as an elementary laboratory school for Elementary Education students. At present, it offers basic education to tertiary education programs.

=== Rodriguez ===
FEU Roosevelt Rodriguez is located on Lardizabal Street, Barangay Manggahan, Rodriguez, Rizal. The campus offers basic education programs from preschool to senior high school and is described by FEU Roosevelt as a growing academic community in Rodriguez, Rizal.

Its Junior High School program is accredited Level II by the Philippine Accrediting Association of Schools, Colleges and Universities (PAASCU), with validity until November 2027. The program received its initial accreditation in November 2011.

FEU has also announced the development of a new building at the Rodriguez campus. In its 2024 annual report, the university stated that a third new building had been approved for the campus, and its 2025 annual report reported the groundbreaking of an upcoming eight-story Senior High School and College Building in Montalban, Rizal, intended to accommodate senior high school and college students.
