= Cainta =

Municipality in Rizal, Philippines

- Municipality
- Municipality of Cainta
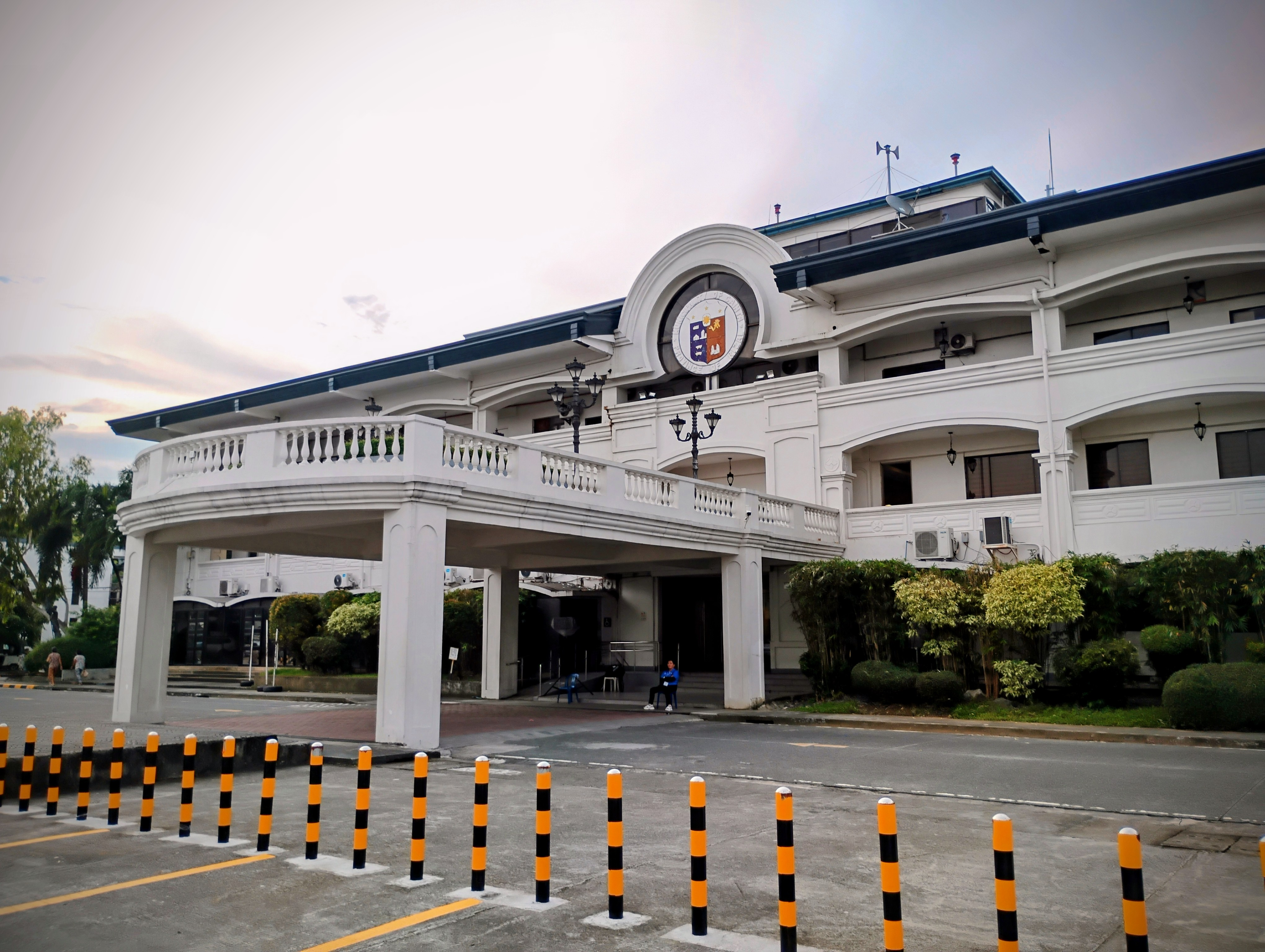
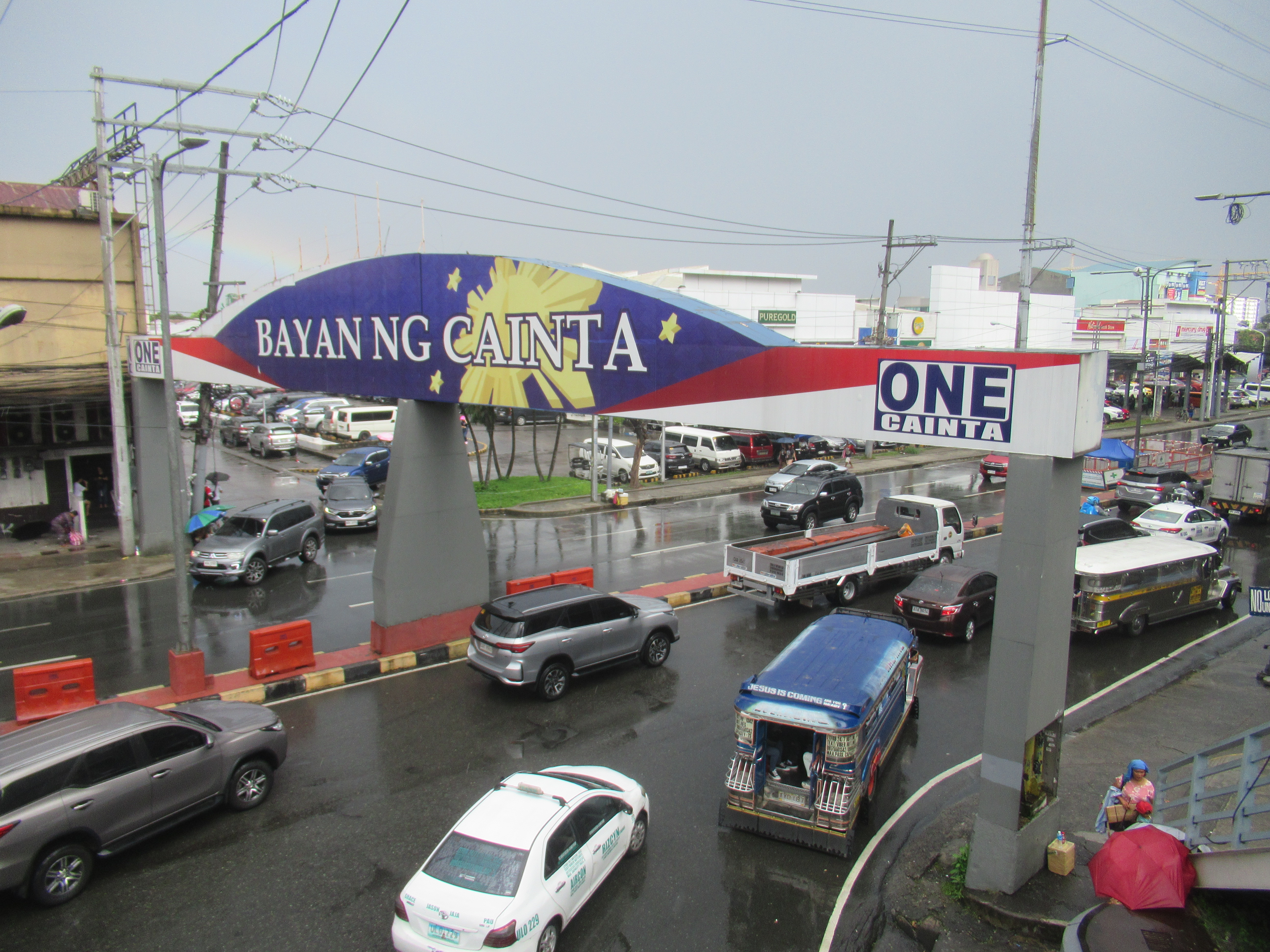
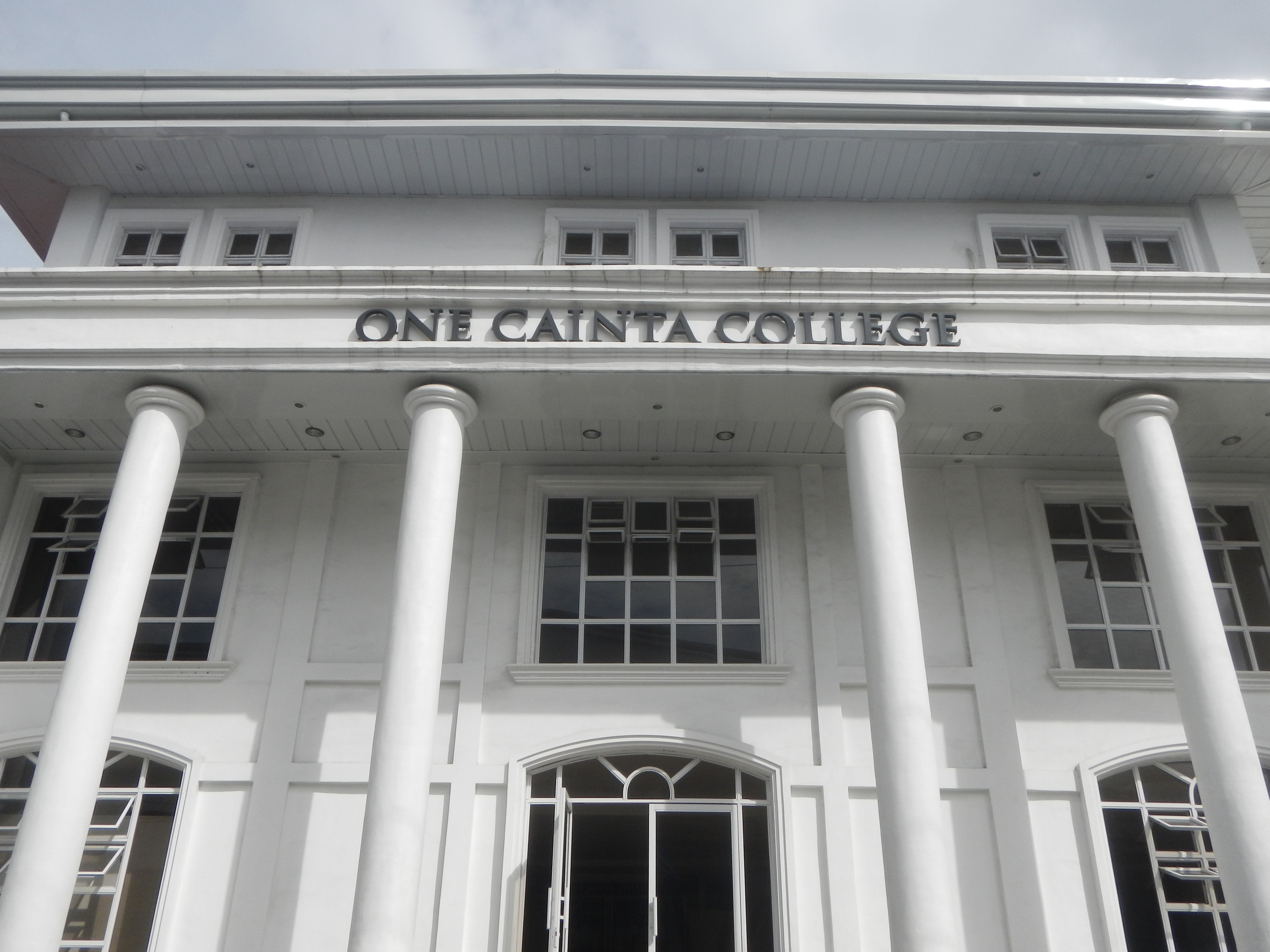
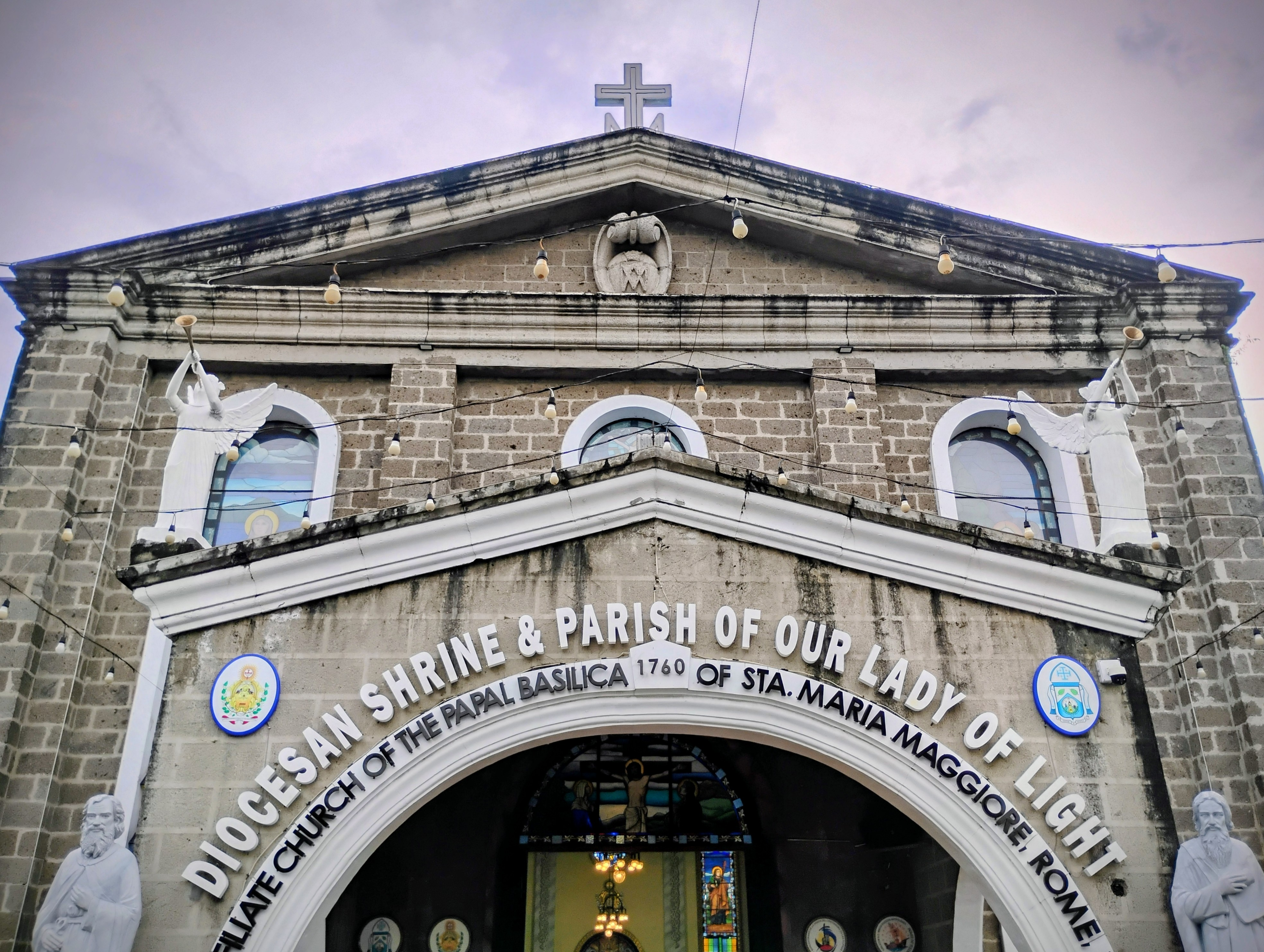
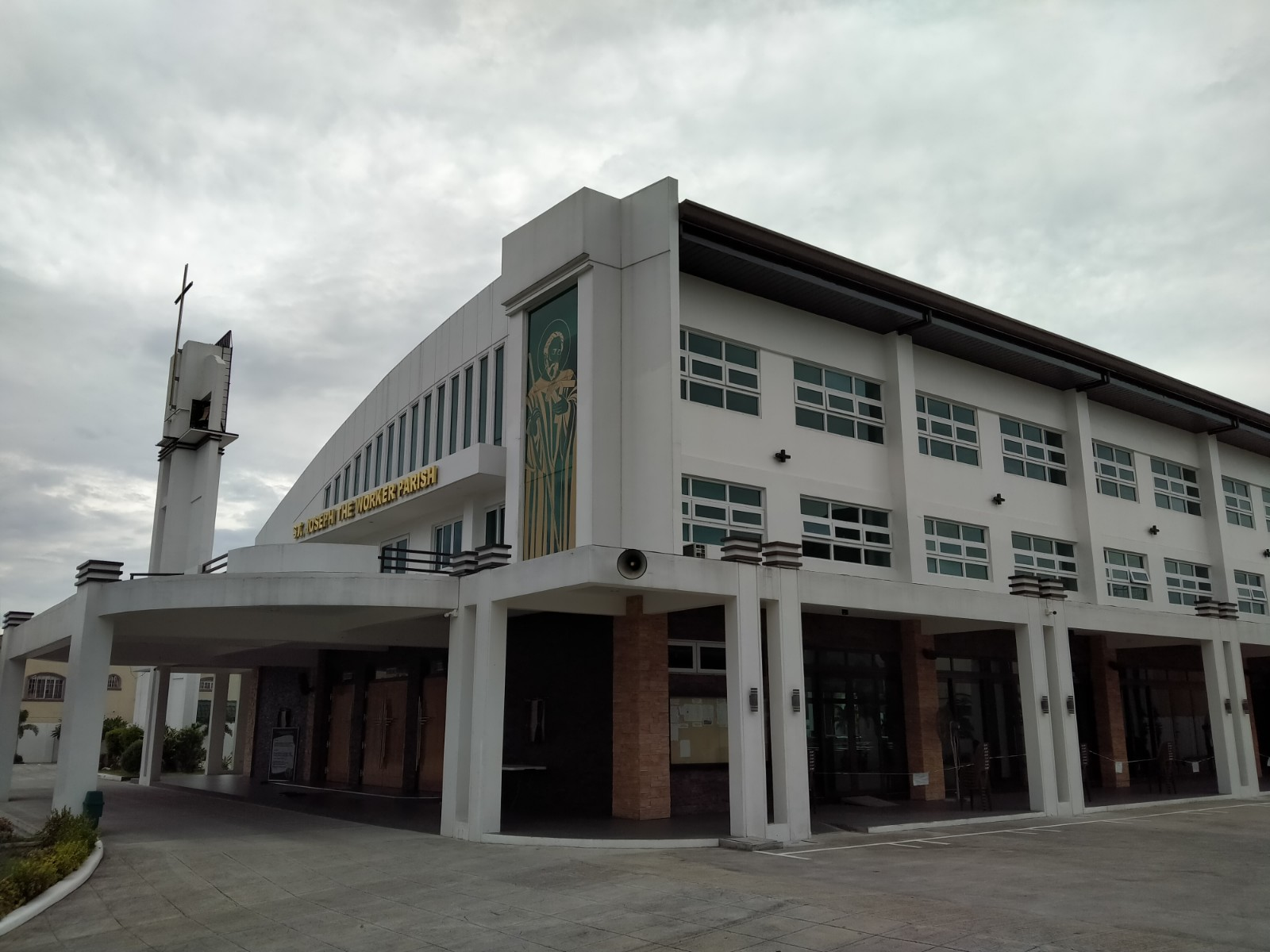
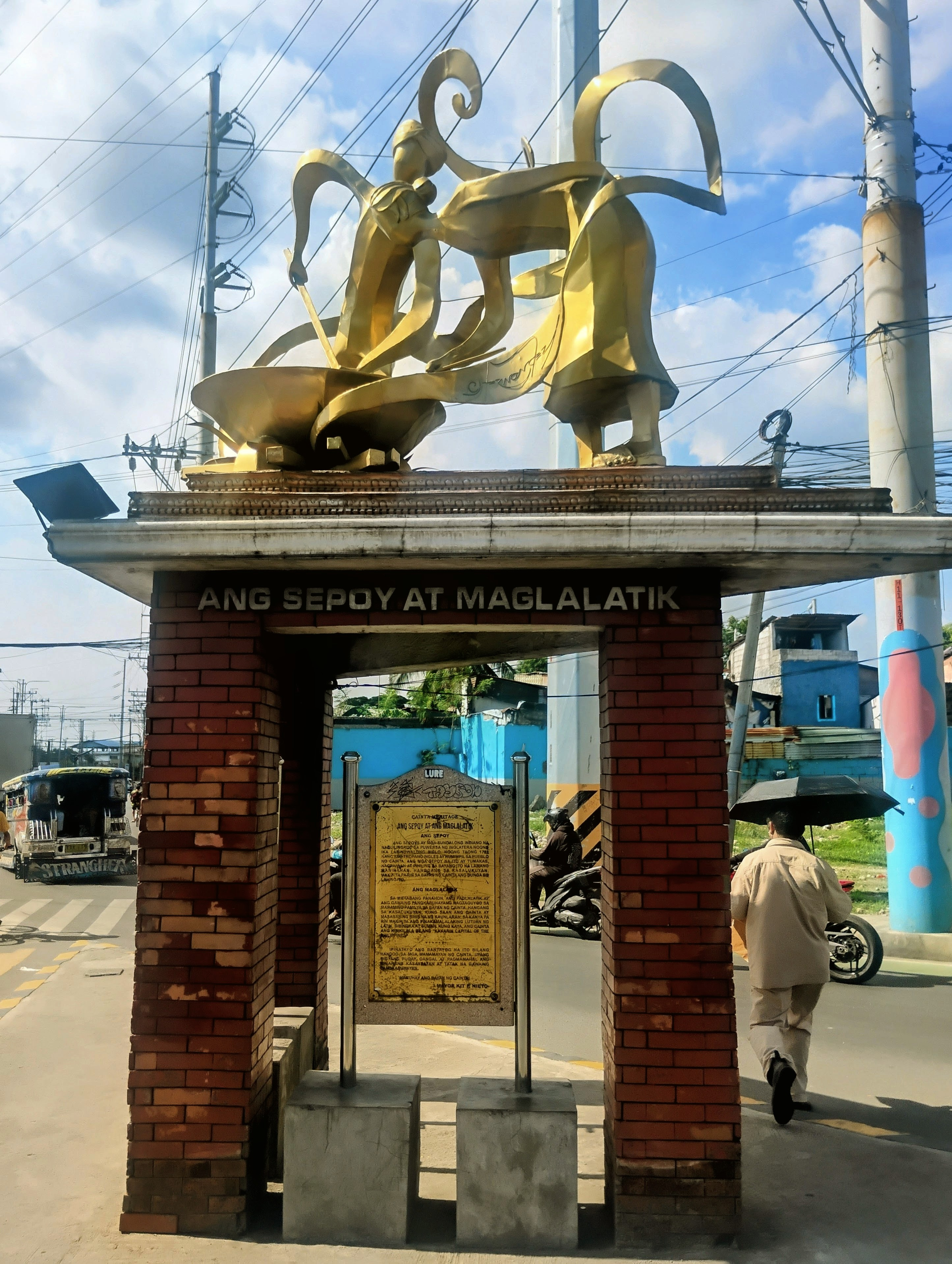
- Cainta Municipal Hall Welcome Arch One Cainta College Cainta Church St. Joseph the Worker Parish Church Ang Sepoy at ang Maglalatik Monument

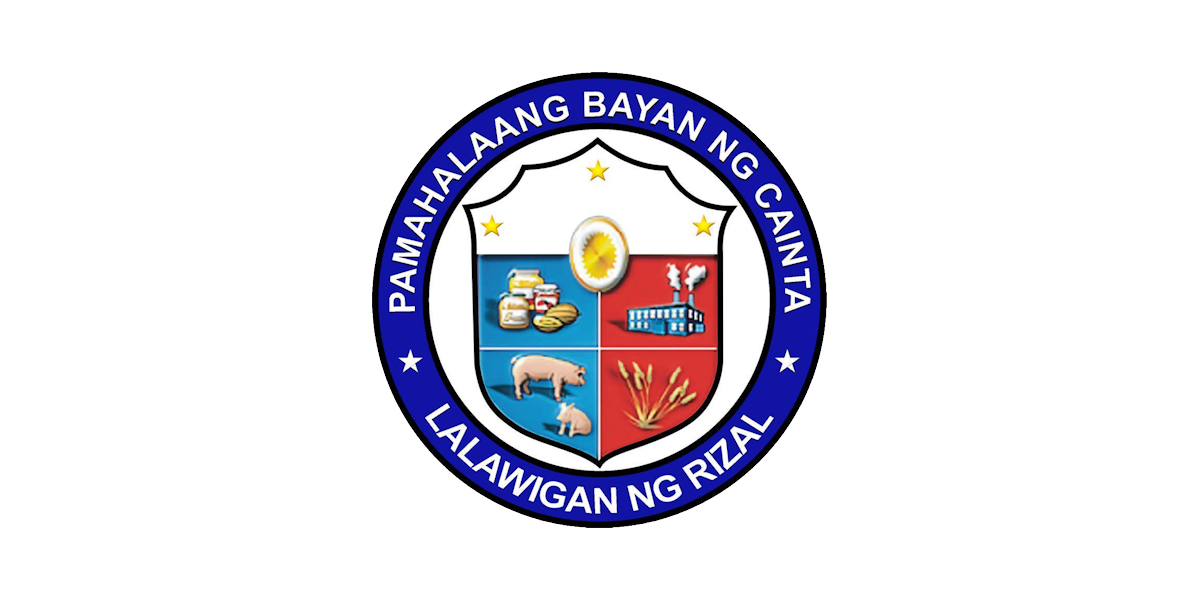
- Flag Seal
- Nicknames: Bibingka Capital of the Philippines; Your Gateway to the East; Information Technology Capital of the Province of Rizal; Philippines' Richest Municipality; Gem of Rizal
- Motto: Isang Cainta (One Cainta)
- Anthem: Isang Cainta (One Cainta)
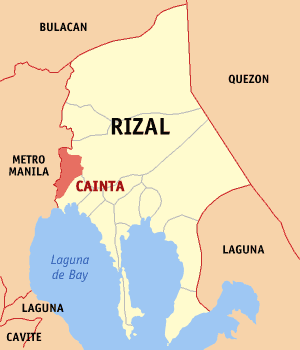
- Map of Rizal with Cainta highlighted
- Interactive map of Cainta
- Location within the Philippines
- Coordinates: 14°34′N 121°07′E
- Country: Philippines
- Region: Calabarzon
- Province: Rizal
- District: 1st district
- Founded: November 30, 1571
- Annexation to Taytay: October 12, 1903
- Reestablished: January 1, 1914
- Barangays: 7 (see Barangays)

Government
  - Type: Sangguniang Bayan
  - Mayor: Johnielle Keith Pasion Nieto
  - Vice Mayor: Ace B. Servillon
  - Representative: Rebecca Ma. A. Ynares
  - Municipal Council: Members: Wilfredo C. Felix; Leofoldo P. Garcia Jr.; Manuel S. Jacob Jr.; Sitti Nuraisha S. Kiram; Snooky D. Malicdem; Rom C. San Juan; Felipe A. Sauro; Ezekiel L. Tajuna
  - Electorate: 177,532 voters (2025)

Area
  - Total: 42.99 km^{2} (16.60 sq mi)
- Elevation: 41 m (135 ft)
- Highest elevation: 134 m (440 ft)
- Lowest elevation: 1 m (3.3 ft)

Population (2024 census)
  - Total: 386,321
  - Density: 8,986/km^{2} (23,270/sq mi)
  - Households: 90,707
- Demonym: Cainteño/a

Economy
  - Income class: 1st municipal income class
  - Poverty incidence: 1.76% (2023)
  - Revenue: ₱ 2,086 million (2024)
  - Assets: ₱ 4,094 million (2024)
  - Expenditure: ₱ 1,385 million (2024)
  - Liabilities: ₱ 2,006 million (2024)

Service provider
  - Electricity: Manila Electric Company (Meralco)
- Time zone: UTC+8 (PST)
- ZIP code: 1900
- PSGC: 0405805000
- IDD : area code: +63 (0)2
- Major religions: Christianity, Islam, Hinduism, Buddhism
- Feast date: December 1
- Catholic diocese: Roman Catholic Diocese of Antipolo
- Patron saint: Our Lady of Light
- Website: www.cainta.gov.ph

Cainta, officially the Municipality of Cainta (Filipino: Bayan ng Cainta, IPA: [kɐʔɪnˈtaʔ]), is a municipality in the province of Rizal, Philippines. According to the 2024 census, it has a population of 386,321 people.

It is one of the oldest municipalities in Luzon (founded on August 15, 1571) and has a land area of 4,299 hectares (10,620 acres). It is also 3rd most populous municipality in the province after Taytay and Rodriguez. Its total assets amounting to ₱3,988,392,142.17 makes it the richest municipality in the country in terms of income.

== Etymology ==
Cainta existed as a village called Cainta when the Spaniards arrived in the 1570s, documented in Spanish records as Cáinta or Caynta. The origin of its name is unknown.

== History ==
=== Battle of Cainta ===
After the death of Rajah Matanda, Adelantado Miguel de Legaspi received word that two ships, San Juan and Espiritu Santo, had just arrived in Panay Island in the central Philippines from Mexico. One ship was under the command of Don Diego de Legaspi, his nephew, and the other of Juan Chacon. The two ships were in such disrepair when they arrived in Panay that one of them was not allowed to return to Mexico. Legaspi ordered that it be docked on the river of Manila. The Maestro de Campo was sent to Panay to oversee its transfer to Manila, with Juan de la Torre as captain.

To help spread the faith, several Augustinian friars were commissioned by Spain and were among the ship's passengers. One of them was Father Alonso de Alvarado, who had been in the armada of Villalobos. Another was Father Agustin de Albuquerque, who became the first parish priest of Taal town, south of Manila. Some of the missionaries were sent to Cebu province in the central Philippines to accompany Father Martin de Rada the Prior. Four stayed to work in Pampanga province and the environs north and south of Manila, which included the then-village of Cainta.

Meanwhile, Legaspi was determined to subjugate the people of Cainta and Taytay, a neighboring town. He sent his nephew Juan de Salcedo with a galleon (a small ship propelled by oars and sails) and 16 small boats accompanied by a hundred Spanish soldiers and many Visayas natives allied with them. Salcedo sailed on August 15, 1571, arriving in Cainta on the 20th. He sought peace from the villagers but the village chiefs responded arrogantly, told him that the people of Cainta, unlike those of Manila, were not cowards, and would defend their village to the death. Confident in the defenses offered by their fort and the security of the site, they were joined by people from Taytay.

These two villages are on a plain on the shores of a river that flows from La Laguna and before arriving there divides in two large arms, both with abundant water. On its banks are found the two villages, half a league from each other, with the river passing through both before finally becoming one in a part of the terrain encircled by thick bamboo groves. These bamboos were tied together with liana, turning them into a thick wall where the people had constructed two ramparts with their moats full of water. By the river, they had built strong stone bulwarks with wooden towers and good artillery (culverins or lantakas), guarded by a large number of warriors armed with arrows, swords and other projectile-type arms.

Deciding to attack, Salcedo first sent Second Lieutenant Antonio de Carvajal with some escorts to reconnoiter the town and determine the weakest point where they could enter. Carvajal, wounded by an arrow in his arm, returned with the information that the weakest spot, the least fortified and with the easiest access was the other part of an arroyo on the side of La Laguna where many boats could be seen entering the river.

Salcedo ordered installed in the prow of the galley a stone-throwing mortar. He and his men then spent the night on shore, while 20 soldiers and numerous allies from Manila remained with Carvajal on the galley with orders that when they heard firing, they should proceed with the attack on the stone bulwarks and the houses in the town, while Salcedo and his men tried to enter through the wall by the arroyo. When they heard the sound of the bugle, the signal that they had taken the town, they were to stop firing.

After giving these instructions, Salcedo began his march and turned toward the river where the attack was to take place. He arrived in the arroyo and found it defended by a group of Cainta warriors who started to fire arrows and hurl lances.

Taken by surprise, the soldiers without waiting for Salcedo's order attacked the rampart and were overwhelmed by a rain of arrows. Finding such tenacious resistance, they began to retreat and flee in disarray.

Salcedo berated his men harshly for having attacked without his orders. Observing that in the other part of the arroyo the rampart was lower, he ordered a skiff brought there and after beaching it, he ordered some of his soldiers to use it as passage to the other side and take a more elevated point from where they could fire at the defenders of the town.

With the defenders retreating, Salcedo and his men were able to approach the wall and breach it. Cainta men came to close the breach, forcing Saavedra to back off.

In the meantime, the cannons of the galley destroyed the stone bulwarks and the houses in the town in a manner the people had not seen before. The shouts of the 600 Visayans allied with the Spanish made the natives believe that the Spaniards were already inside the poblacion [town proper]. Because of this, defenders of the breach abandoned it and retreated to the center of the town.

Salcedo observed this from a distance and ordered the breach attacked again. This time, the Spaniards encountered little resistance. Led by Salcedo and with Saavedra carrying the Spanish banner, they succeeded in entering the town. Together with their soldiers, they advanced rapidly and shortly scaled the wall where a bloody battle was fought.

The Cainta men preferred to die rather than surrender. Having taken over the stone walls, the Spaniards climbed the towers and hoisted the Spanish banner. At the blare of the bugle, the cannons stopped firing from the galley.

=== Spanish rule ===
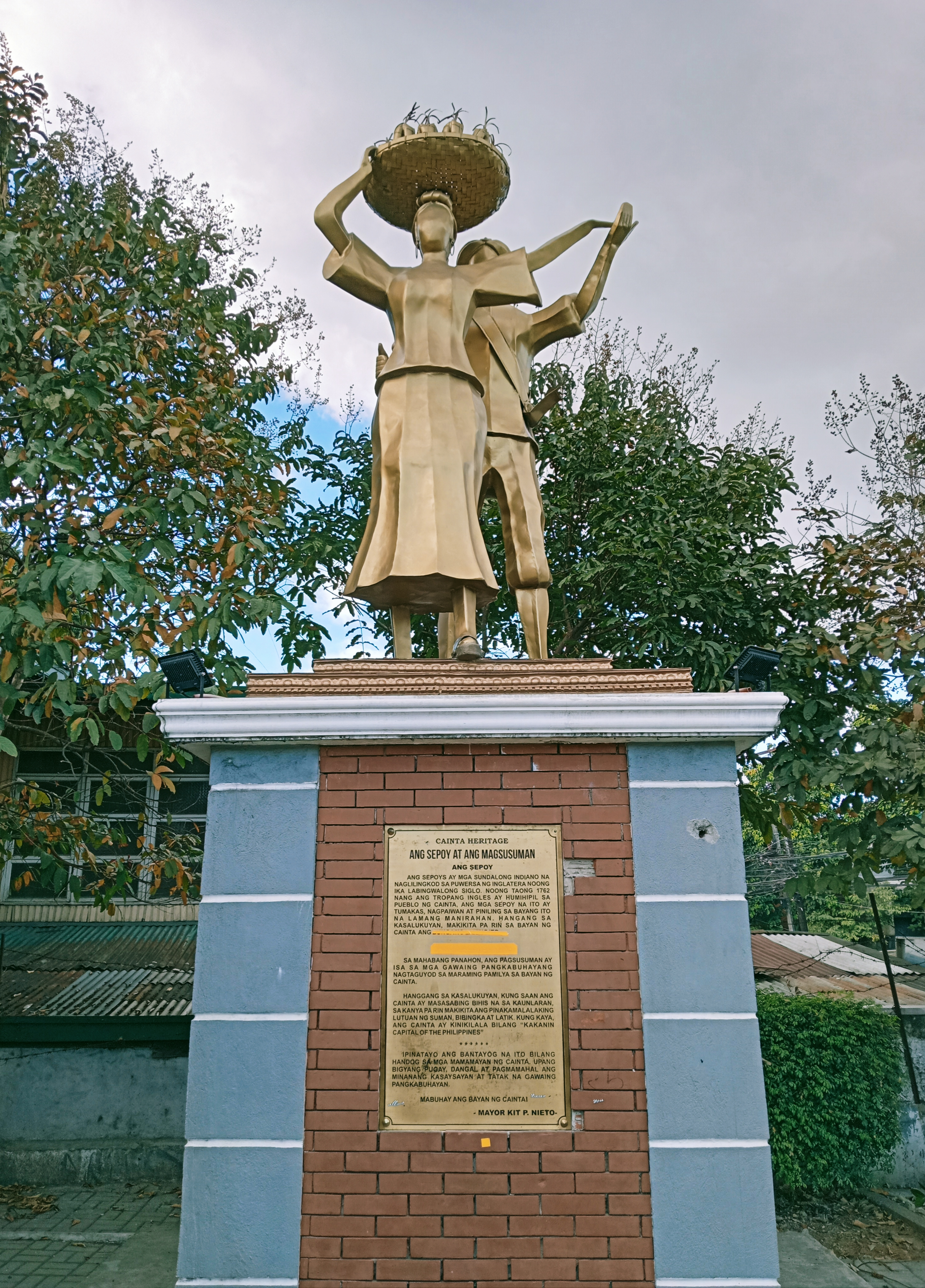
Ang Sepoy at ang Magsusuman

Founded on November 30, 1571, Cainta was a fiercely independent village that fought valiantly against the Spaniards but was later defeated and became a visita (annex) of Taytay in 1571 under the Jesuits. Changes in ecclesiastical administration made Cainta a part of Pasig under the Augustinians but it was deeded back to the Jesuits by the king of Spain in 1696. Cainta became a separate township in 1760.

==== Conversion to Catholicism ====
The chief religion is Roman Catholicism. When the Spaniards arrived, they celebrated the feast of St. Andrew the Apostle and a mass was held in a chapel made of nipa palm branches and wood. Many people came to attend and consequently were baptized into the faith.

The Church of Cainta was completed in 1715. It was gutted during World War II. Only the outer walls and the facade remained which was repaired with a coat of Portland cement. In 1727, an image depicting Our Lady of Light was brought to Cainta from Sicily, Italy, and was among the structures destroyed by Japanese and the joint American and Filipino bombs. Except for the outer walls, now greatly renovated, hardly anything remains of the old church. Extensive damage was also caused by recurrent earthquakes and typhoons that plagued the Philippines. The natives helped in its restoration and the new building was completed on February 25, 1968, and blessed by Manila Cardinal Archbishop Rufino Jiao Santos.

Cainta became an independent town in 1760. During the brief British occupation of Luzon (1762–1763), part of its British India troops known as sepoys lived and intermarried with the natives in one of the town's barrios. The Indian left a culinary legacy in the spicy and highly seasoned dishes that are now part of mainstream Cainta cuisine. Cainta became part of Tondo (starting 1763) but separated in 1883 and incorporated with the district of Morong.

=== American colonial era ===
==== March 16, 1899 ====
Exequiel Ampil was assigned by Emilio Aguinaldo to liberate Cainta.

Major William P. Rogers, commanding officer of the 3rd Battalion, 20th US Infantry Regiment, came upon the Filipinos in Cainta, about 1,000 strong, and forced them to retreat. He burned the town. Two Americans were killed and 14 wounded, while the Filipinos suffered about 100 killed and wounded.

Upon the approach of the Americans, Exequiel Ampil y Dela Cruz, the Presidente Municipal of Cainta and a former Agente Especial of the Katipunan who had become a pronounced Americanista, strongly advised the Filipino soldiers to surrender. Instead, they shot him. Although wounded, Ampil managed to escape.

On March 3, 1902, major American newspapers including The New York Times reported: "…Felizardo, at the head of twenty-five men armed with rifles, entered the town of Cainta and captured the Presidente of Cainta, Señor Ampil, and a majority of the police of the town. Señor Ampil has long been known as an enthusiastic American sympathizer, and it is feared that he may be killed by the enraged ladrones (thieves & land grabbers). A strong force of constabulary has been sent to try to effect his release." In actuality, Timoteo Pasay was the leader of the guerilla band that kidnapped Ampil on Feb 28, 1902.

On March 4, 1902, near the hills of Morong town, Ampil found an opportunity to escape. A detachment of constabulary was taken from the garrison at Pasig and stationed at Cainta for his protection, he survived the war. And upon retiring from his military and political career, Don Exequiel Ampil together with his wife Doña Priscila Monzon, applied and managed their vast estate from corner of Ortigas Ave. and C. Raymundo Ave., Brgy. Rosario, Pasig City, to Cainta River (San Jose, Cainta) up to the Valley Golf area (Brgy. Mambugan, Antipolo City, Rizal) down to Ortigas Extension (San Isidro, Taytay). The lots were the old and the new Municipal Halls stands, were also part of his estate.

Their son Dr. Jesus Ampil also became a Mayor (grandfather of the Ampil Brothers in Bacolod City); whose siblings where Lumen, Atty. Vicente (of Pasay), Rosario, and Jose.

==== Inclusion in Rizal province ====
On October 12, 1903, under the American rule, Cainta and Angono were consolidated with Taytay as one government entity. On January 1, 1914, it once again became an independent municipality and remained so to this day.

=== World War II ===
In 1942, Japanese occupation troops entered Cainta. By the time of the Allied invasion in 1945, soldiers of the Philippine Commonwealth Army 4th, 42nd, 45th, 46th, 47th, and 53rd Infantry Divisions and the Philippine Constabulary 4th Constabulary Regiment partook in the liberation of Cainta and aided the local guerrilla groups of the Hunters ROTC against the Imperial Japanese Armed Forces.

The general headquarters, camp bases, and garrisons of the Imperial Japanese Army were captured. After the war, the local casualties were over 3,810 killed in action and 12,400 wounded in action for the Philippine Commonwealth Army and Philippine Constabulary, 200 killed in action and 700 wounded in action for the local guerrillas of the Hunters ROTC, and 15,000 killed in action, 36,000 wounded in action, and over 3,400 captured for the Imperial Japanese Army.

=== Post-war ===
On May 9, 1992, a fire broke out at the town's municipal hall two days before the 1992 local elections. The Rizal Provincial Police Command concluded that the fire was accidental, having been caused by a negligent janitor, although the PNP Criminal Investigation Service Command (CISC) refuted this, citing eyewitness accounts to the contrary. By August 1993, Secretary of Justice Franklin Drilon ordered the reopening of the case due to evidence found to be conflicting with the initial conclusions by a team of prosecutors at the Department of Justice.

== Geography ==
Cainta is bounded on the north by Marikina and Antipolo, on the west by Pasig, and on the east and south by Taytay. It lies in the Marikina Valley, is 10% rolling hills and 90% residential-industrial. It has the province's highest number of rivers and streams. Historians claim that Cainta's old geographical boundaries encompassed the mountain slopes of Montalban.

Cainta is 17 kilometres (11 mi) from Manila and 9 kilometres (5.6 mi) from Antipolo.

Cainta serves as the secondary gateway to the rest of Rizal province from Metro Manila. With the continuous expansion of Metro Manila, Cainta is now part of Manila's conurbation, which reaches Cardona in its easternmost part and is therefore one of the most urbanized towns.

=== Barangays ===
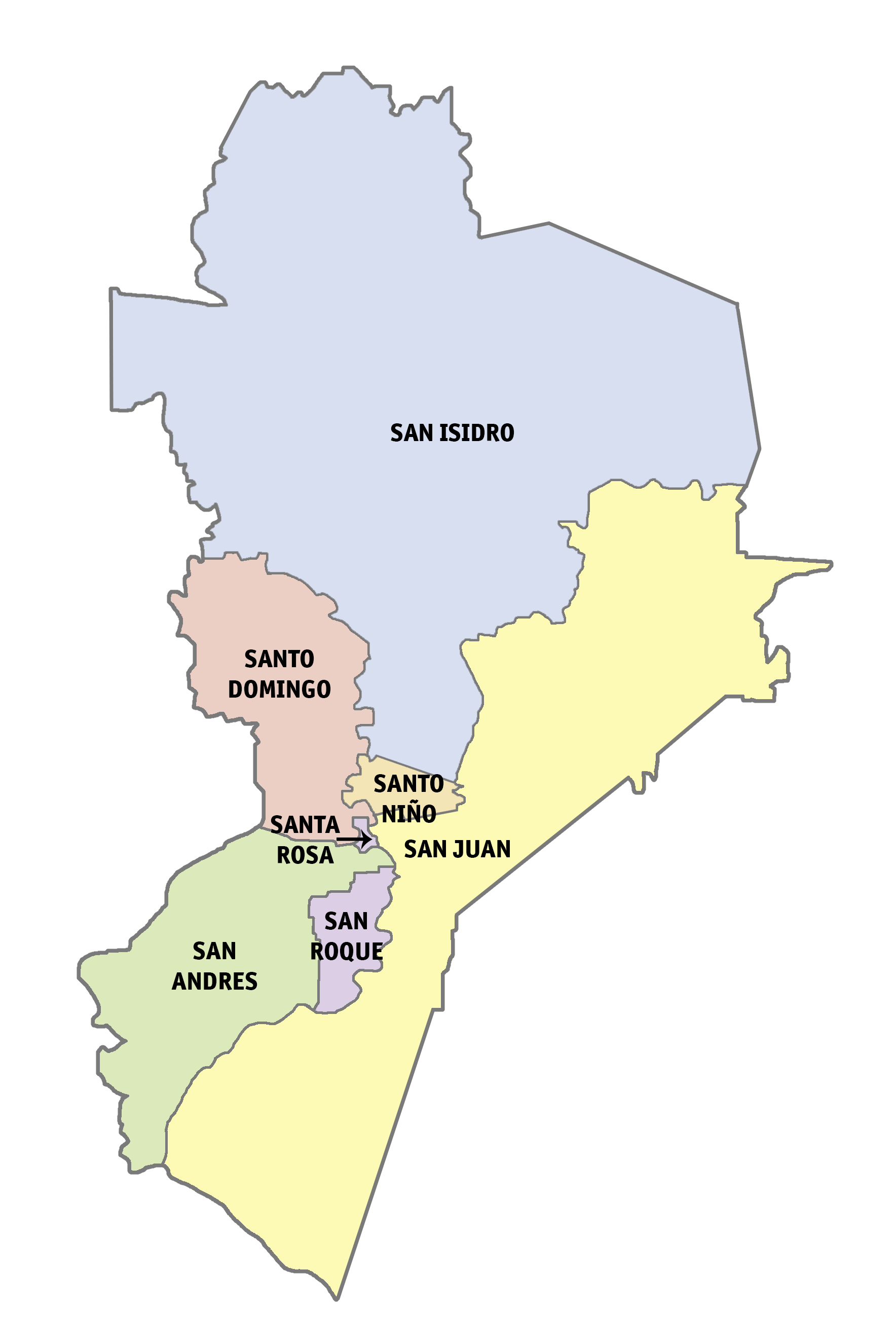
Political map of Cainta, Rizal (includes Cainta claims)

Cainta is politically subdivided into seven barangays, as indicated below and in the image herein. Each barangay consists of puroks and some have sitios.

Barangay	Population (2024)	Area
San Andres (Poblacion)	122,983	
San Isidro	89,533	
San Juan	106,450	
San Roque	10,704	
Santa Rosa	1,776	
Santo Domingo	48,526	
Santo Niño	6,349	
Total	386,321	

In the mid-1990s, Cainta submitted a petition to the Rizal provincial government to consider a proposal for 18 additional barangays, to make a total of 25 barangays. The proposal is still pending.

=== Climate ===
Climate data for Cainta, Rizal
Month	Jan	Feb	Mar	Apr	May	Jun	Jul	Aug	Sep	Oct	Nov	Dec	Year
Mean daily maximum °C (°F)	29 (84)	30 (86)	32 (90)	34 (93)	33 (91)	31 (88)	30 (86)	29 (84)	29 (84)	30 (86)	30 (86)	29 (84)	31 (87)
Mean daily minimum °C (°F)	20 (68)	20 (68)	21 (70)	23 (73)	24 (75)	25 (77)	24 (75)	24 (75)	24 (75)	23 (73)	22 (72)	21 (70)	23 (73)
Average precipitation mm (inches)	7 (0.3)	7 (0.3)	9 (0.4)	21 (0.8)	101 (4.0)	152 (6.0)	188 (7.4)	170 (6.7)	159 (6.3)	115 (4.5)	47 (1.9)	29 (1.1)	1,005 (39.7)
Average rainy days	3.3	3.5	4.8	8.1	18.9	23.5	26.4	25.5	24.5	19.6	10.4	6.4	174.9
Source: Meteoblue

== Demographics ==
Population census of Cainta
Year	Pop.	±% p.a.
1903	1,761	—
1918	2,686	+2.85%
1939	3,075	+0.65%
1948	3,692	+2.05%
1960	6,803	+5.22%
1970	20,714	+11.76%
1975	36,971	+12.32%
1980	59,025	+9.80%
1990	126,839	+7.95%
1995	201,550	+9.07%
2000	242,511	+4.05%
2007	304,478	+3.19%
2010	311,845	+0.87%
2015	322,128	+0.62%
2020	376,933	+3.36%
2024	386,321	+0.59%
Source: Philippine Statistics Authority

In the 2024 census, the population of Cainta was 386,321 people, with a density of 9,000 inhabitants per square kilometre or 23,000 inhabitants per square mile.

Its population consists of 70% Roman Catholic Christians, 15% Non-Catholic Christians (including Baptists, Evangelicals, Iglesia ni Cristo, Members Church of God International, Aglipayan, Jesus Is Lord, and others), 10% Muslims, 3% Chinese Buddhists, and 2% Sikhs. The people of Cainta are mostly Tagalog-speaking Filipinos.

A considerable number of the population are descended from Indian soldiers who mutinied against the British Army when the British briefly occupied the Philippines in 1762 to 1763. These Indian soldiers called sepoys were Tamil people from Chennai and settled in town and intermarried with native women. The sepoy ancestry of Cainta is still very visible to this day, particularly in Barrio Dayap near Barangay Sto. Niño.

== Economy ==
Poverty incidence of Cainta (%)

Source: Philippine Statistics Authority

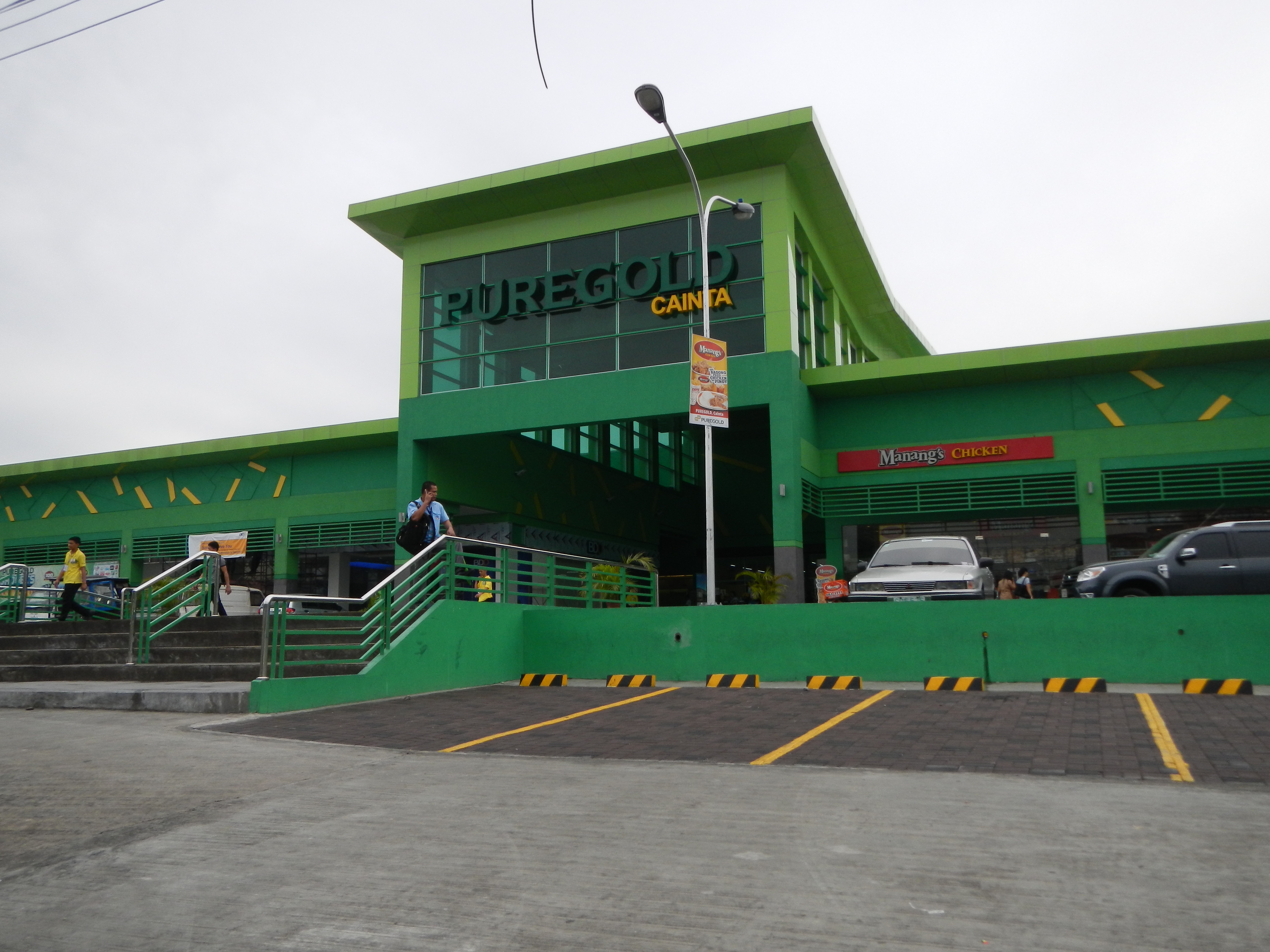
Puregold Cainta

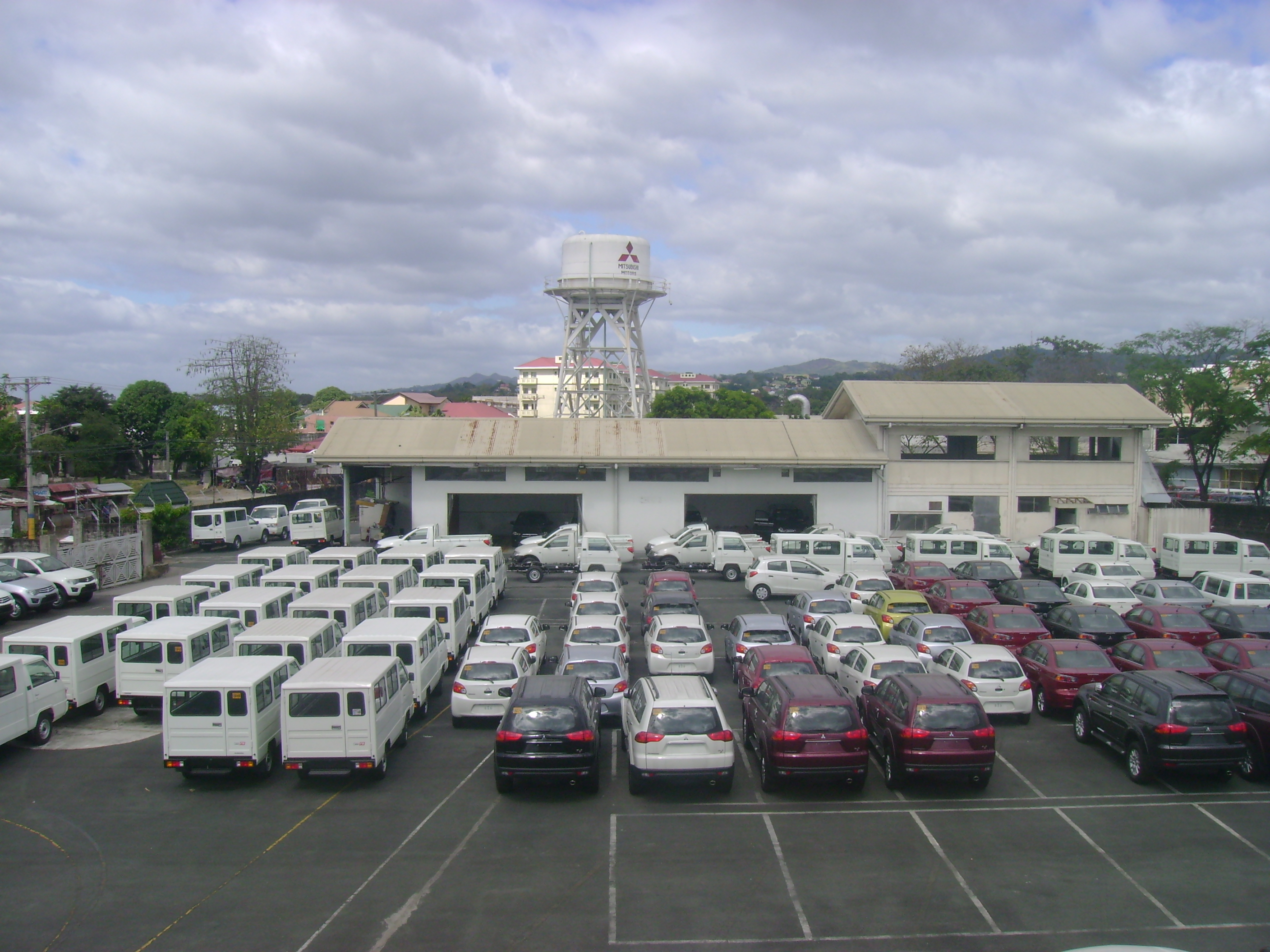
Former Mitsubishi Motors Plant in Cainta which operated from 1963 to 2015, then demolished in 2017. The site is now a mixed-use development site rebuilt by Robinsons Land Corporation as Sierra Valley Gardens opened in 2020, with a proposed Cyber Park and Robinsons Sierra Mall.

Cainta is a highly urbanized town, which has an abundant mix of commercial, industrial, and real estate businesses. As of 2018's Commission on Audit report, the town is the richest municipality in the country in terms of total assets. Cainta continues to attract businesses due to its proximity to Manila and the town's burgeoning population.

=== Native delicacies ===
Cainta is known for its native delicacies, a tradition inherited from nearby Antipolo, which is largely a cottage industry. Dating back to the 15th century, it became the town's principal source of income for more than four centuries. Suman (rice cake wrapped in banana leaf), latik (boiled down coconut milk used for glazing), coconut jam and the bibingka are some of the sweet delicacies that have been popular with visitors to the town.

During the 20th century, Cainta dazzled the whole country when it baked the biggest rice cake ever and the town became known as the "Bibingka Capital of the Philippines". Bibingka is believed to have been adapted from the Indian cuisine, an influence from its Sepoy population. It comes from the Indian word bebinca also known as bibik, a dessert made of flour, coconut milk, and egg. The Philippine version is made of rice flour, coconut milk, and salted duck eggs. Butter and sugar are used for glazing after cooking and before serving.

== Government ==
Municipal Hall of Cainta

=== Elected officials ===
The following are the elected officials during the 2025 elections, serving a term that will expire in 2025:

Title	Name
Mayor	Johnielle Keith P. Nieto
Vice mayor	Ace B. Servillon
Councilors	Wilfredo C. Felix
Councilors	Ezekiel L. Tajuna
Councilors	Leopoldo P. Garcia Jr.
Councilors	Manuel S. Jacob Jr.
Councilors	Snooky D. Malicdem
Councilors	Felipe A. Sauro
Councilors	Rom C. San Juan
Councilors	Sitti Nuraisha S. Kiram

=== Mayors ===
Mayors	Year Started	Year Ended
Exequiel Ampil	1898	1907
Jose Dela Cruz	1907	1911
Julian Javier	1911	1923
Francisco P. Felix	1927	1941
Jesus Ampil	1941	1945
Francisco P. Felix	1945	1980
Benjamin V. Felix*	1980	1986
Renato Estanislao	1986	1988
Benjamin V. Felix	1988	1998
Nicanor Cruz Felix	1998	2004
Ramon A. Ilagan	2004	2013
Johnielle Keith Nieto	2013	2022
Maria Elenita Dungo-Nieto	2022	2025
Johnielle Keith Nieto	2025	present

- Benjamin Felix was deposed after People Power Revolution; replaced by OIC Mayor Dr. Renato Estanislao

=== Vice mayors ===
Vice mayors	Year Started	Year Ended
Jimmy Alcantara	1972	1976
Benjamin V. Felix	1976	1980
Octavio Gripal	1981	1984
Zoilo V. Tolentino	1984	1986
Vicente Landicho	1986	1987
Reynaldo Matias	1987	1998
Julio Narag	1998	2007
Arturo Sicat	2007	2013
Sofia Velasco	2013	2019
Ace Servillon	2019	present

=== Municipal seal ===
The logo of Cainta – the emblem inside the double circle represents the flag of the Philippines in red, white and blue color. The three stars represent Luzon, Visayas and Mindanao. The eight sun rays represent the eight provinces that started the revolt against the Spaniards. The buildings represent the different business establishments operating in the municipality. The suman sa ibus, suman sa lihiya and suman antala represent the livelihood of its people; the same with bottled sweets made out of coconut milk called matamis na bao, nata de coco, caong, beans and many others. The piglets represent the backyard hog raising, a small-scale industry.

== Notable places ==
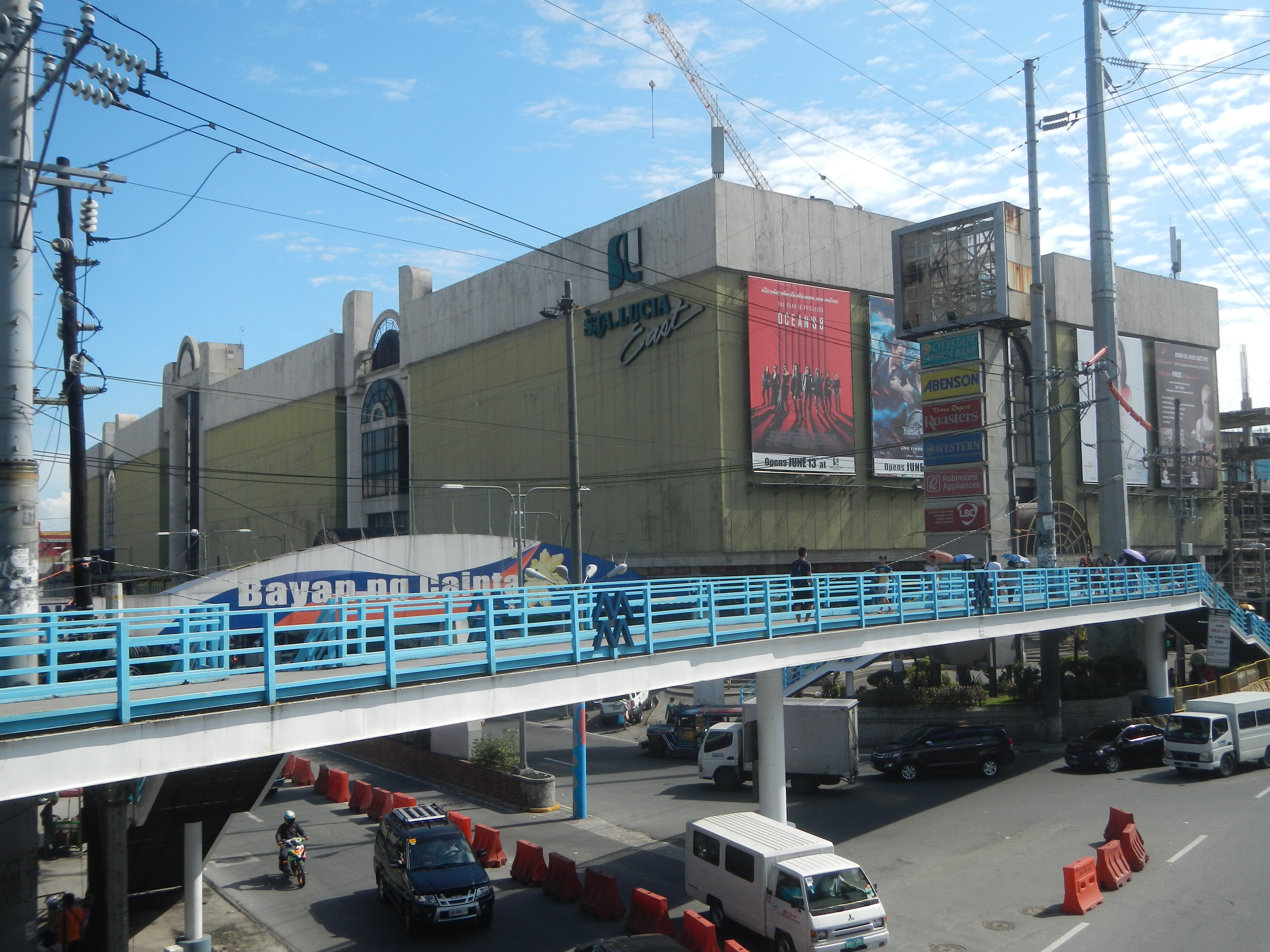
The Sta. Lucia East Grand Mall located at the corner of F. P. Felix Avenue and Marcos Highway (R-6).

- APT Studios - Owned by APT Entertainment, which was the former airing site of the longest running noontime show in the Philippines "Eat Bulaga" from December 8, 2018, until May 31, 2023.

The facade of APT Studios in Marcos Highway.

- Our Lady of Light Parish Church - one of the oldest Catholic churches in the province.

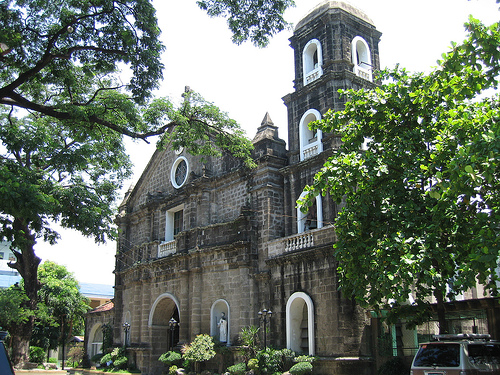
The restored Diocesan Shrine and Parish of Our Lady of Light (Church of Cainta) blessed on February 25, 1968.

- Sierra Valley Gardens - a mixed-use development site built by Robinsons Land Corporation opened in 2020. The site was the former manufacturing plant of Mitsubishi Motors Philippines Corporation which operates from 1963 until 2014, then later the MMPC officially opened their new manufacturing facility in Santa Rosa, Laguna on January 30, 2015.
- Sta. Lucia East Grand Mall - a large shopping mall named and owned by Sta. Lucia Realty & Development, and is one of the largest shopping to the east of Metro Manila, and one of the first malls in Rizal.

== Culture ==
During Cainta's modernization period, traditions became more glamorous, most especially during the Lenten season. The most noteworthy rituals are the Cenakulo (a stage play of the passion and death of Christ) and the Ang Pagpapapako or Penetencia (a re-enactment of the crucifixion of Christ).

=== The Cenakulo ===
The Senakulo in Cainta dates back to 1904. It originated from Barrio Dayap (the entire area now includes Barangays Santa Rosa, Sto Niño and Santo Domingo). At that time, the population consisted of a small group of residents who were mostly related to each other. Since most of the people believed that calamities were brought in by evil spirits, they decided to put up a cross on a vacant lot to counter them. The barrio people paid homage to the cross by lighting it every night. One memorable incident happened during the Lenten season when a strange fragrance supposedly emanated from the cross. The news spread out not only in the barrio but also in the entire town of Cainta.

Believing in the mystery of the cross, many people in Barrio Dayap and the whole town of Cainta have since then vowed to read the Pasyon (Seven Last Words of Christ) every Lenten season. This has been enriched by an actual portrayal of the Passion of Christ on the streets which was formerly called "Officio". Many problems have been allegedly solved and illnesses cured through the cross as many people continuously believed.

Over the years the followers of the cross have multiplied rapidly. To give deeper meaning to their devotion and showcase their religiosity, they broached the idea of staging the Pasyon. The first stage play was held a few years later, although initially it was limited in scope. It became so popular that the presentation was expanded to include stories from the Old Testament and other stages in the life of Christ and has become known as the Cenakulo. The venue was transferred to an open field in 1966 to accommodate a larger audience.

Krus Sa Nayon, Inc. (KSNI) was established as early as 1900 during and after Spanish era. The group was also known for its extravagant preparation and passion play every night of the Holy Week period. The KSNI cenakulo play was previously held at the Jaika Compound beside the municipal building and Francisco P. Felix Memorial National High School. To date, the play is held at the stage beside the municipal ground, alongside the One Cainta Police Headquarters and One Cainta Fire Department.

Samahang Nazareno Inc. was organized in 1960, developed and enhanced the various aspects of cenakulo. The local Roman Catholic parishioner gave the association its moral and financial support for it believed that it was an effective means of imparting its Christian message to the public.

=== Cainta Day ===
Every December 1, the town celebrates its foundation and feast of Our Lady of Light (Ina ng Kaliwanagan). It is celebrated with its own festival, SumBingTik (portmanteau of suman, bibingka, and latik), which started around 2014. The week long celebration consists of various activities such as paint ball tournament, battle of the bands, Miss Cainta beauty pageant, and Caindakan sa Kalsada, a street dance parade joined by local schools and organizations.

== Infrastructure ==
=== Transportation ===
The main road of Cainta is Ortigas Avenue Extension, a heavily congested corridor that passes through the business district of Ortigas Center and leads to Mandaluyong and San Juan in the west and the town of Taytay and Antipolo in the east. The other major road is Felix Avenue, which runs across Ortigas Avenue Extension and connects the town to Marikina to the north. Passing through Cainta Junction, it becomes A. Bonifacio Avenue, a part of Manila East Road, which also connects the town further into Taytay. A future interchange of the Southeast Metro Manila Expressway (also known as the C-6 or the Metro Manila Skyway Stage 4) in Taytay will provide access to the town.

Public transportation is abundant, as jeepneys and UV Express from surrounding cities in the west like Pasig, Mandaluyong, and Quezon City, pass through the town going to other Rizal towns such as Antipolo, Taytay, to as far as Tanay.

Buses are also traversing almost the same routes as jeepneys, with a premium point-to-point bus service introduced in 2019, linking Cainta (Sierra Valley) to Makati Central Business District.

The extended Light Rail Transit Line 2 (LRT-2) includes a train station near the northern tip of the town called Marikina—Pasig Station. The city will also be served by the future Manila Metro Rail Transit Line 4 (MRT-4).

==== Bus route ====
- Raymond Bus Transportation Inc (Legarda Manila via Infanta, Quezon)
- Mrr Transport Inc (Legarda Manila via Real Infanta in Quezon Province)
- G Liner (via Quiapo and Angono, Taytay in Rizal Province North South Bound via EDSA corner Ortigas Avenue Mandaluyong Pasig Border)
- RRCG Transport
- EMBC Bus plies all over Rizal and East Portion Of Laguna
- DLTBCo. (Pasay City Taft Buendia via Santa Maria or in Mabitac Market)

=== Utilities ===
Water
The town is supplied 24 hours a day with potable water from Manila Water, the MWSS concessionaire for the East Zone, along with several towns in Rizal Province.

Telecommunications
Globe and PLDT, primarily provide landline and mobile voice, while SMS and data services are provided by Globe, Smart, and DITO throughout the town. Others provide alternative data solutions like Converge and Sky Broadband.

=== Facility ===
The MNL1 Data Center is a proposed hyperscale green data center campus to be built in Cainta, Rizal. If built, MNL1 will become the largest data center in the Philippines.

== Education ==
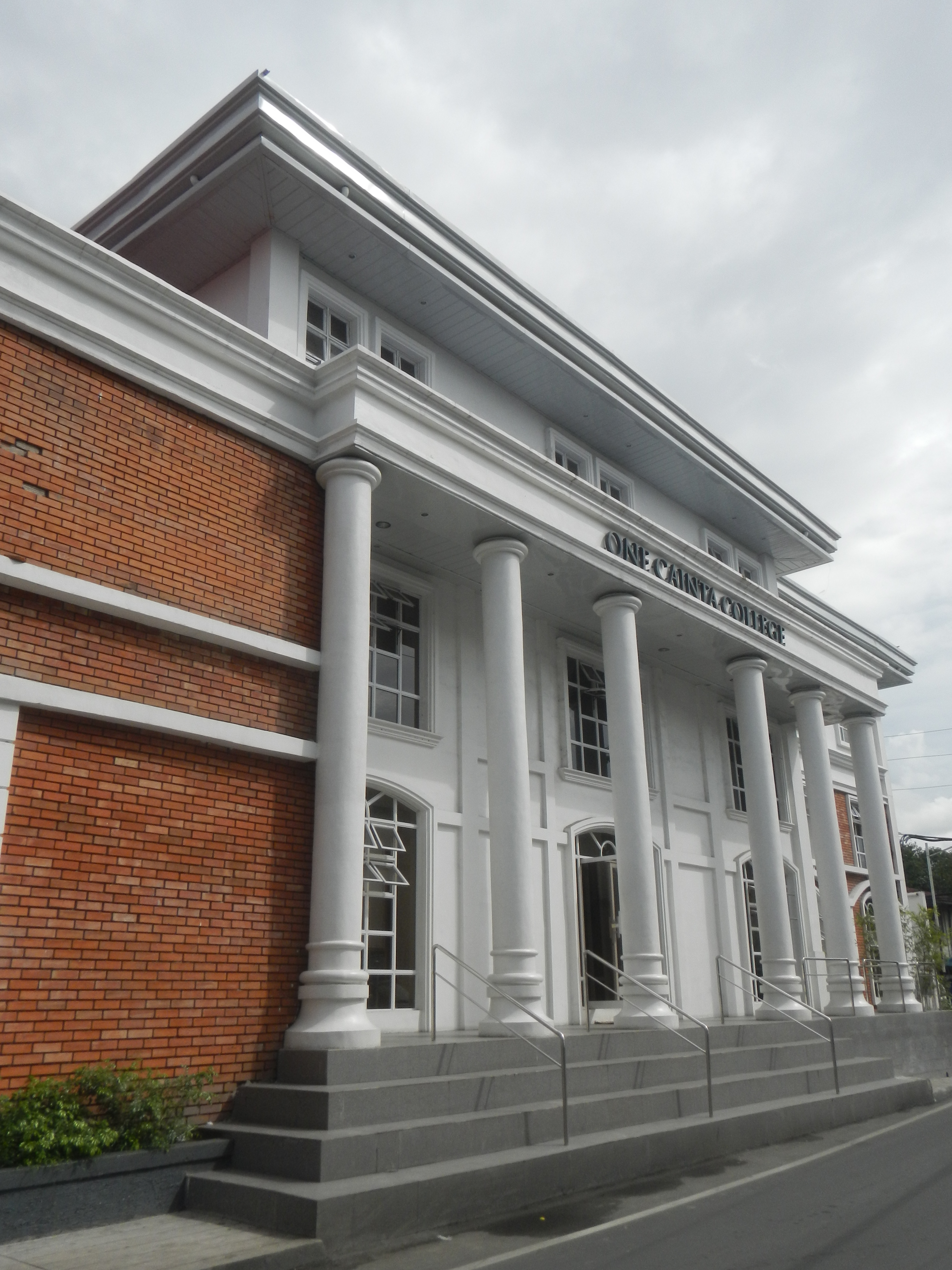
One Cainta College

There are two schools district offices which govern all educational institutions within the municipality. They oversee the management and operations of all private and public, from primary to secondary schools. These are the Cainta I Schools District, and Cainta II Schools District.

=== Primary and elementary schools ===
- Academy of Christian Excellence Montessori
- Agapeland Christian Academy
- APEC Schools Ortigas Extension
- Arinda Elementary School
- Balanti Elementary School
- Cainta Elementary School
- Cainta Wesleyan Academy
- Colegio Sto. Domingo (Elementary)
- College of San Benildo (Elementary)
- Dayspring Academy Greenland Academy
- Divine Angels Montessori
- Exodus Elementary School
- Faith Christian School
- Felix Main Elementary School
- Felix Unit 1 Elementary School
- FEU Roosevelt - Cainta
- Greenland Academy
- Greenland Academy Cainta
- Harvest of Wisdom Montessori School
- Kabisig Elementary School
- Karangalan Elementary School
- Life Touchers Community School
- Light Bearer Christian Academy
- Lorenzo Ruiz de Manila School
- Marick Elementary School
- Pilgrim Baptist Academy
- Planters Elementary School
- Roots of Learning Center
- Saint Francis of Assisi Montessori School of Cainta
- San Francisco Elementary School
- San Juan Elementary School Main
- San Juan Elementary School Unit 1
- Scholastica De San Alfonso
- Smart Tot School
- St. Gregory Elementary School
- St. Therese of Lisieux School
- Valley View Academy
- Zion Center of Knowledge School

=== Secondary schools ===
- Berea Arts and Sciences High School
- Francisco P. Felix Memorial National High School - Main, JICA, Karangalan
- Governor Isidro Rodriguez Memorial National High School
- Greenpark High School
- San Juan National High School

=== Higher educational institutions ===
- ABE - Felix Avenue
- Cainta Catholic College
- College of Saint John Paul II Arts & Sciences (Formerly SJB IAS Cainta)
- FEU Roosevelt - Cainta
- ICCT Colleges
- Informatics - Cainta Brickroad Campus
- National University - East Ortigas
- One Cainta College
- St. John Bosco Institute of Arts and Sciences
- STI - Academic Center - Ortigas Avenue Extension
- University of Rizal System - Cainta Campus (Public)

== Notable people ==
- Rocco Nacino, actor
- Ai-Ai delas Alas, actress/comedienne
- Alvin Patrimonio, retired professional Filipino basketball player
- Tin Patrimonio, athlete (tennis) player, model, actress, and a former reality show contestant
- Camille Prats, actress, model
- Aster Amoyo, television host, talent manager, columnist
- Lourence Ilagan, PDC darts player
- Mon Ilagan, broadcaster, former mayor of Cainta who served in 2004 - 2013
- Amy Perez, actress, host
- Bea Alonzo, actress
- Vince Maristela, actor
