= Francisco P. Felix Memorial National High School =

Public high school in Rizal, Philippines

- Pang-alaalang Mataas na Paaralang Nasyonal ng Francisco P. Felix (Filipino)

Location
- Municipal Compound, A. Bonifacio Avenue, Barangay Santo Domingo; Cainta, Rizal; Philippines; 14°34′47.2″N 121°06′49.2″E

Information
- Type: Public school
- Motto: "Teamwork Towards Excellence"
- Established: 1973
- School code: 301437
- Principal: Absalon C. Fernandez
- Grades: 7 to 10
- Enrollment: 14,087 (2010–2013)
- Campuses: Rosepack Main; JICA Annex; Karangalan Annex
- Colors: Blue and White
- Nickname: Felixians
- Newspaper: The Sepoys; Ang Maglalatik
- Affiliations: Republic of the Philippines; Department of Education; Region IV-A; Division of Rizal
- Website: fpfmnhs-alumni.org

Francisco P. Felix Memorial National High School (Filipino: Pang-alaalang Mataas na Paaralang Nasyonal ng Francisco P. Felix) is a secondary public high school located at Municipal Compound, Brgy. Sto. Domingo, Cainta, Rizal, Philippines. The school was founded in 1973 and is recognized as the "Division Leader School" in Rizal.

== History ==
The Cainta Municipal Government passed a resolution that aimed to open a public secondary school that would serve the people of Cainta. In 1973, the Cainta Municipal High School was established under Francisco P. Felix, the municipal mayor at that time.

Initially the school employed five teachers from Rizal High School in Pasig who were housed in a twelve-room building in Parola, Barangay San Andres. One of them was Principal IV, Juana M. Garrovillas. At first, classes were held in the morning and afternoon but later classes were opened in the evening for working students with a ₱5.00 (equivalent to ₱234.36 in 2021) tuition fee.

The first principal was Generosa Masikip. During her administration, the first steel flag pole was constructed. The first issue of the school paper, The Sepoys and Ang Maglalatik was published in 1978 under the guidance of Juana Garrovillas and Marita Uy as the first advisers. In 1980, the school was renamed in honor of the late Mayor Felix who was responsible for establishing this leader school.

Felixians joined different inter-school contests not only in the province but also at national level. When Genesius Fulgueras became principal, the school expanded tremendously. In 1987, it was designated a national high school under President Corazon Aquino, who declared free secondary education. Several annexes have been built to accommodate the increasing population. The current annexes are Rosepack Main, JICA Annex, Karangalan Annex and Rosepack Extension. Defunct annexes are Manggahan Annex (now known as San Juan National High School of Cainta), Parola Annex (now a tricycle terminal), Balanti Annex (now known as Governor Isidro Rodriguez Memorial National High School of Cainta) and LTO Annex (now a Cainta Equipment Depot).

It remained headless for one year until the appointment of its former teacher, Juana M. Garrovillas as principal. There are 34 sections in fourth year, 34 sections in third year, 32 sections in second year and 36 sections in first year, making it the fastest growing school in the province outnumbering Rizal National Science High School in terms of student population.

Last January 2014, Ms. Juana M. Garrovillas, Principal IV, was replaced by Dr. Vidal Mendoza Ph.D., Principal IV of San Mateo National High School.

== Administration ==
The school has been run by several officers-in-charge and principals:

- Jesus Tanyag : 1973–1975 (OIC)
- Timoteo Pascual : 1975–1978 (OIC)
- Generosa Masikip : 1978–1986 (the first principal of FPFMNHS)
- Genesius Fulgueras : 1986–2000
- Edna V. Peres : 2000-2001
- Dr. Roman M. Salazar : 2001–2002
- Marissa S.J. Gatapia : 2002 (OIC)
- Juana M. Garrovillas : 2003–2014
- Vidal F. Mendoza, Ph.D. : 2014–2018
- Reynante V. Flandez : 2018–2022
- Edna H. Villamayor : 2022–present

== Secondary programs ==
=== Junior High School ===
- Grade 7-10
