= Nossa Senhora da Luz =

Nossa Senhora da Luz (Portuguese 'Our Lady of Light') may refer to the following :

- Our Lady of the Candles, a venerated Marian apparition

== Places, churches and jurisdictions ==
in Brazil

- Our Lady of Light Cathedral, Guarabira (Catedral Nossa Senhora da Luz), Paraiba, Brazil

in Cape Verde

- Nossa Senhora da Luz (Maio), in the municipality and island of Maio
- Nossa Senhora da Luz (São Domingos), in the municipality of São Domingos, island of Santiago
- Nossa Senhora da Luz (São Vicente), in the municipality and island of São Vicente
