= Cainta Church =

Roman Catholic church in Rizal, Philippines

- Diocesan Shrine and Parish of Our Lady of Light
- Parroquia de Nuestra Señora de Lumen (Spanish)
- Simbahan ng Caintâ (Filipino)
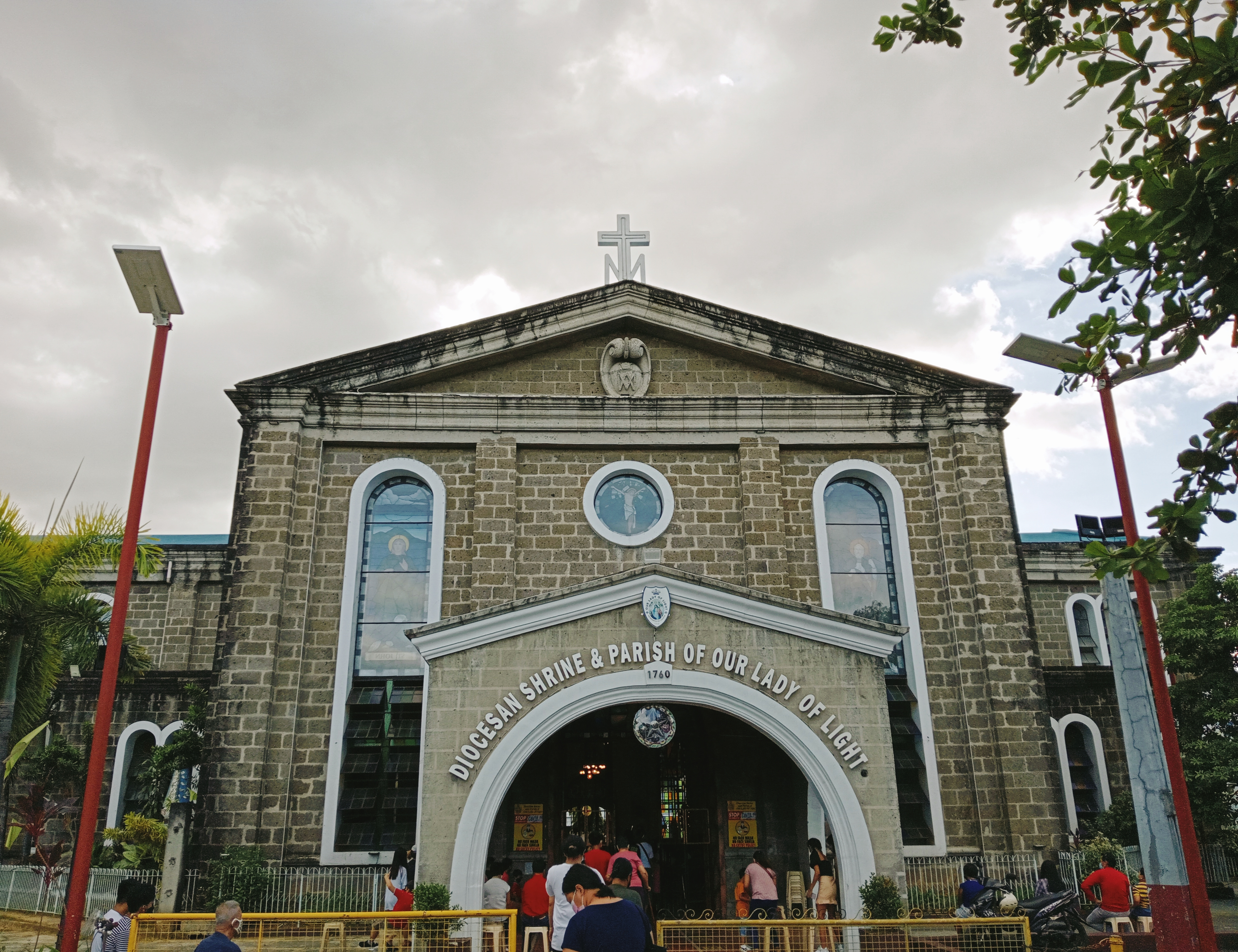
- Church facade in 2021

- Location in Luzon Location in the Philippines
- 14°34′41″N 121°06′56″E
- Location: A. Bonifacio Ave., San Andrés, Cainta, Rizal
- Country: Philippines
- Denomination: Roman Catholic

History
- Status: Active
- Founded: 1760
- Founder: Jesuits
- Consecrated: February 25, 1968

Architecture
- Functional status: Diocesan shrine and parish church
- Heritage designation: Marked Historical Structure
- Designated: 2007
- Architect(s): Gaspar Marco (first church); Galo Ocampo (reconstructed church)
- Architectural type: Church building
- Style: Baroque, Renaissance revival
- Groundbreaking: 1707 (first church); 1966 (reconstructed church)
- Completed: 1716 (first church); 1968 (reconstructed church)
- Demolished: 1899 (first church)

Specifications
- Capacity: 2,500 people
- Length: 144 feet (44 m) (first church); 223 feet (68 m) (reconstructed church)
- Width: 48 feet (15 m) (first church); 138 feet (42 m) (reconstructed church)
- Height: 36 feet (11 m) (first church); 34.4 feet (10.50 m) (reconstructed church)
- Materials: Stone and reinforced concrete

Administration
- Archdiocese: Archdiocese of Manila
- Diocese: Diocese of Antipolo
- Parish: Our Lady of Light

The Diocesan Shrine and Parish of Our Lady of Light, commonly known as Cainta Church, is a Roman Catholic parish church located along Andres Bonifacio Avenue in Barangay San Andres, Cainta, Rizal, in the Philippines. The church also operates a neighboring school, Cainta Catholic College. From its time of erection as a parish in 1760 until 1983, it belonged to the Archdiocese of Manila. It was placed under the newly created Diocese of Antipolo in 1983, which is now headed by Ruperto C. Santos. It belongs to the Vicariate of Our Lady of Light.

On December 6, 2017, Pope Francis granted the papal bull of canonical coronation towards its enshrined Marian image and it was crowned on December 1, 2018. The venerated image is a destroyed Sicilian painting from 1727, recreated by Philippine national artist Fernando Amorsolo due to the burning of the original relic during the Filipino-American war in 1899. It is the first Marian image in Philippine history to be pontifically crowned as an artistic painting. On the same day as its canonical coronation, the parish church was consecrated and elevated into a Diocesan Shrine.

== History ==
The original church of Cainta was first constructed in stone by Father Gaspar Marco, a Jesuit priest, in 1707. The shrine at the time was under the patronage of Saint Andrew the Apostle. The construction of the stone church was designed by Juan de Salazar, and was completed during the time of Joaquin Sanchez in 1716 while he was still the parish priest.

In 1727, a painting of Our Lady of Light was brought in from the Kingdom of Sicily and was chosen as the new patroness of the church. By 1760, the church was officially declared a separate parish.

On February 23, 1853, an earthquake damaged the church building. Both its roof and one wall collapsed while the walls of the parish rectory or convent sustained cracks.

By 1884 the parish had been named Our Lady of Light (Virgen ng Caliuanagan or Madre Santissima del Lumen in Tagalog and Spanish languages), as attested in the August 5, 1884, letter by the pastor of Cainta Don Mariano de San Juan to the Archbishop of Manila, Pedro Payo.

== Filipino-American War ==
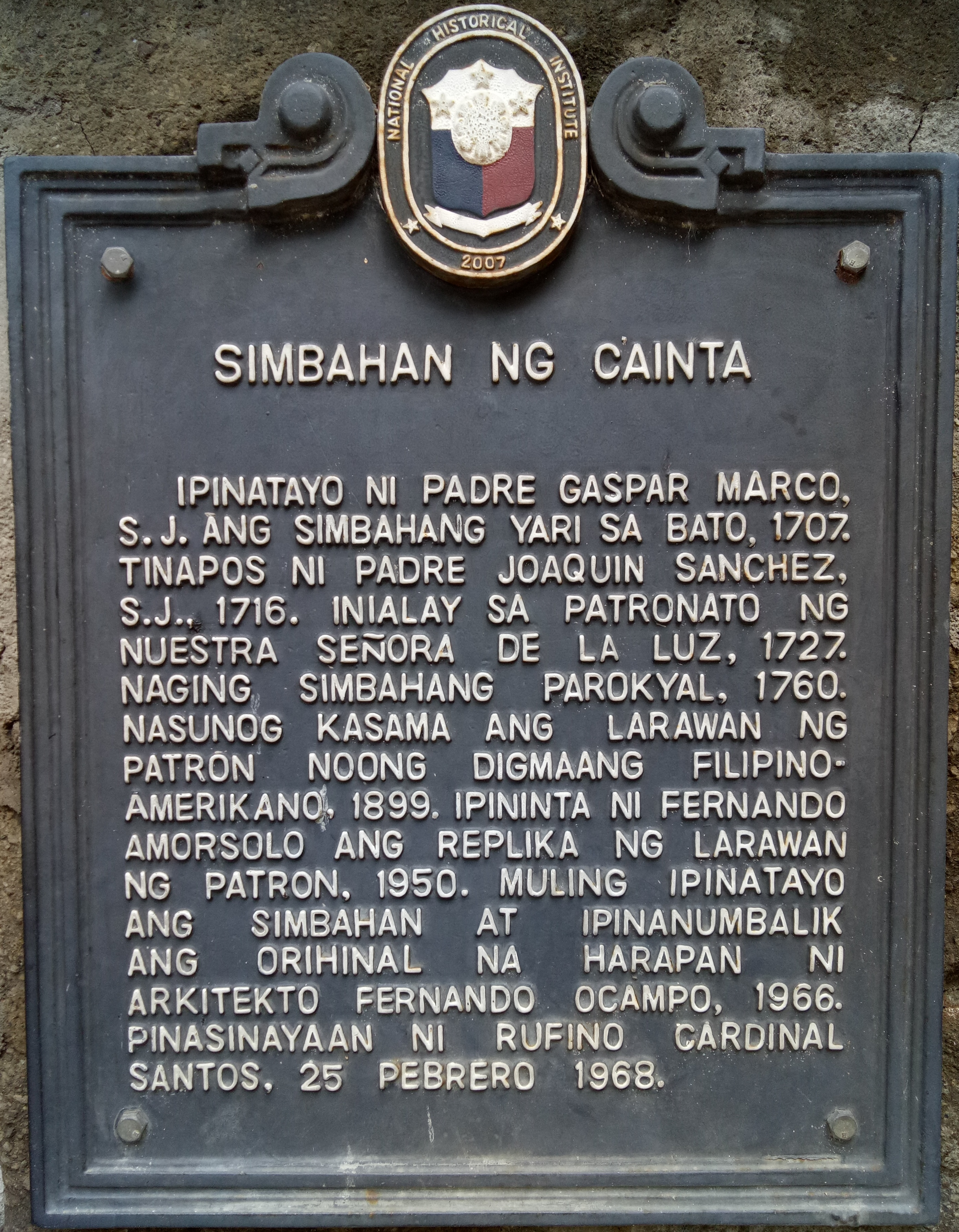
The 2007 NHI marker declaring Cainta Church a historical site for its role during the Filipino-American War

During the Filipino-American War in March 1899, the church and parish rectory of Cainta were burned down including the venerated Marian image within. Stones from the church walls were later used to build roads. The only mark left of its Jesuit beginning was attached at the top portion of the church's façade – the monogram of the Holy Name of Jesus "IHS" (Latin: Iesus Hominum Salvator). The church was left in ruins for 67 years without any significant restoration.

== Reconstruction ==
By the mid-1960s, Archbishop of Manila, Cardinal Rufino Santos, instructed the director of the National Museum of the Philippines, Galo Ocampo, to study the possibility of reconstructing the church on its original site. On February 15, 1965, Santos gave permission for the church's reconstruction, which began on June 10, 1966. The facade was kept untouched.

The reconstruction was halted when one of the beams collapsed. Further study was conducted to determine if it could withstand earthquakes. The reconstruction resumed on June 15, 1967, and completed after one year.

Filipino National Artist Fernando Amorsolo was commissioned to create a replica of the icon of the Blessed Virgin Mary. Devotees today consider Amorsolo's replica the Philippine version of the original painting of Our Lady of Light in Palermo, Italy. The restoration and reconstruction of the parish was completed and was blessed by Cardinal Santos on February 25, 1968.

In 1975, the administration of the parish was turned over by the CICM Missionaries to the Archdiocese of Manila, with Alfredo Santa Ana as its first diocesan parish priest.

The church was the sole parish in the entire municipality of Cainta until 1998, when the community of Brookside Subdivision was granted a parish, Sacred Heart of Jesus. In 2002, three new independent parishes were erected in villages along Imelda Avenue. Parts of Barangay San Andres were later given to newly established parishes, namely San Andres Apostol in Greenwoods Executive Village (2009) and Saint Francis of Assisi in Cambridge, Floodway (2011). More parishes were canonically established: the Parish of St. Joseph the Worker (2015) in Greenland, and St. Oscar Romero Quasi-Parish (2019) in Marick Subdivision.

In 2007, the Cainta Church was declared a historical site by the National Historical Institute (NHI) – now the National Historical Commission of the Philippines (NHCP) – for its significant role during the Philippine–American War. On December 1 that year, the newly renovated altar and the new historical marker of the church were blessed. An episcopal coronation was held on December 1, 2012, coinciding with the parish fiesta, and performed by the local bishop with the assistance of former ambassador to the Vatican, Henrietta De Villa.

== Architectural features ==
The original church, including the sacristy and rectory, was made of stone and limestone (calycanto) while the roof was tiled. It measured approximately 144 feet (44 m) long, 48 feet (15 m) wide and 36 feet (11 m) high. It had a dome (media naranja), transepts (crucero), and five buttresses (contrafuertos). The nave's spacious presbytery had windows and skylight (claraboya). The belfry had four bells, two of which were small bells rung by rotation (esquitas). The baptistery with an arched ceiling was situated at the bottom of the belfry. Flooring was made of wood. It also had a choir loft, communion rail, pulpit and three doors. Five retablos were found inside the church. The original picture of the Our Lady of Light was enshrined at the central niche.

The sacristy measured approximately 27 feet (8.2 m) long, 24 feet (7.3 m) wide and 18 feet (5.5 m) high. On the other hand, the parish rectory measured approximately 120 feet (37 m) long, 48 feet (15 m) wide and 24 feet (7.3 m) high. The rectory had a kitchen, two brick chimneys, four rooms and offices.

The larger reconstructed church measures 223 feet (68 m) long, with transept width 138 feet (42 m) wide, and with walls 34.4 feet (10.50 m) high. It has a main door and four lateral doors. There are separate chapels for the Blessed Sacrament and for Our Lady of Light and Saint Andrew, both enshrined at the sides of the sanctuary. The bell tower, which is attached to the church building, has arched windows.

== Marian image ==
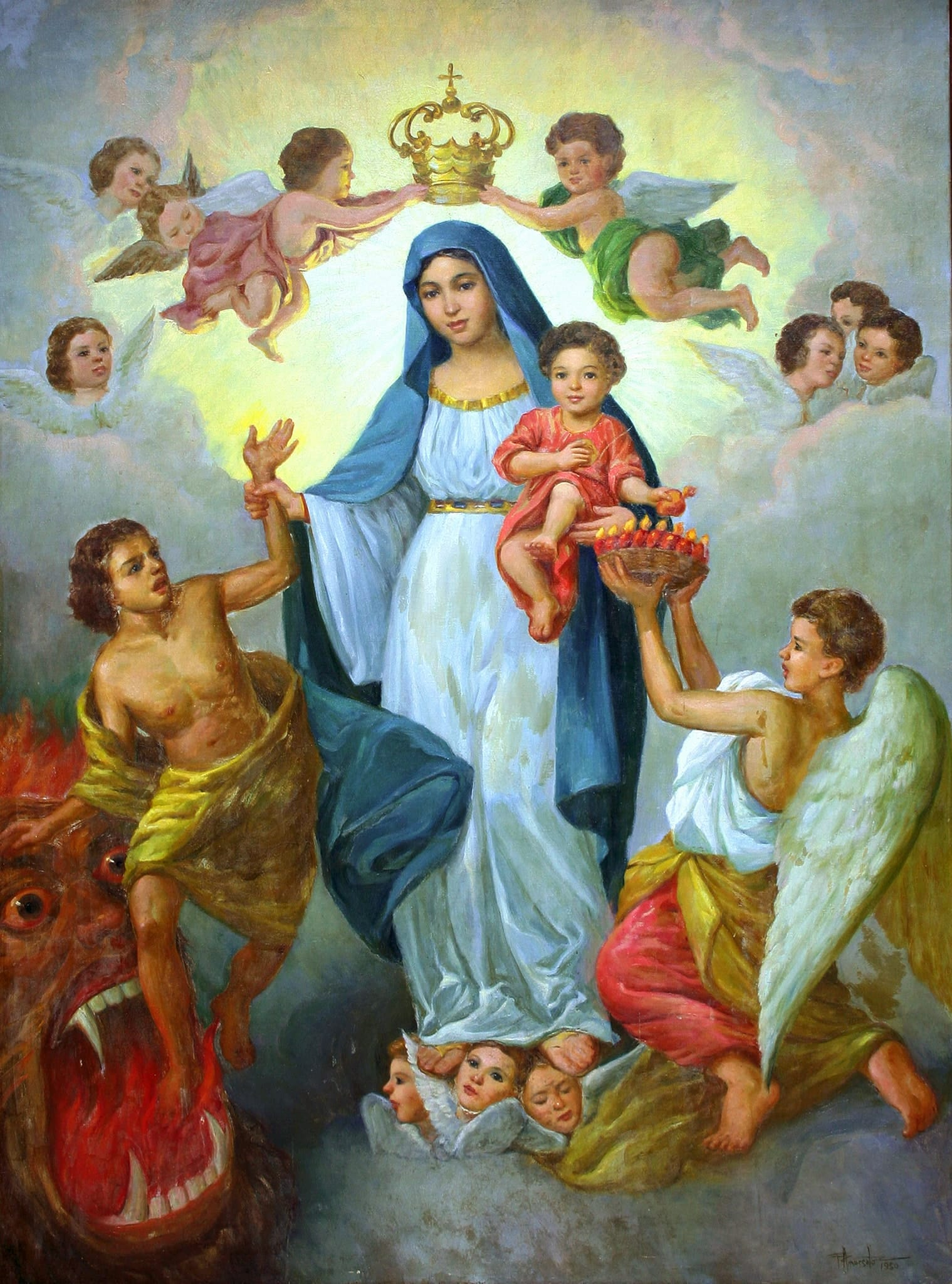
The venerated painting of the Our Lady of Light after undergoing conservation treatment. Pope Francis granted its Canonical coronation on December 1, 2018.

The devotion to Our Lady of Light was introduced in Cainta in 1727. The original picture brought by the Jesuits had a gilded frame and crest and was enshrined in one of the side altars (colacerales). It was transferred to the main altar (retablo mayor) before 1853. Two faithful copies of the original picture exist. The first was an 1801 print given to those who gave donations to the Virgin Mary with bottom inscription:

Verdadero retrato de Nuestra Señora Reina del Universo – María Santísima – Madre de Lumen que se venera en la Iglesia de Cainta en su propia capilla a solicitud y expensa de ciertos devotos de esta gran Señora en el año de 1801. (English: True image of Our Lady Mary, Queen of the Universe, Most Holy Mother of Light that is venerated in the Church of Cainta in her own chapel, upon the commission and expense of certain devotees of this Great Lady in the year 1801).

The second faithful copy is a charcoal painting by Mariano Javier of Cainta, painted in 1857. Presently, it is under the care of the family of Flora Javier-Buenviaje.

The present painting of the Our Lady of Light was painted using oil on canvas by the National Artist Fernando Amorsolo. Over time, the painting had developed some discolorations and acquired dirt and insect excrement. Specialists were consulted who recommended conservation. Conservation procedures were done in four months by Carmina Silverio, a conservator and restorer of paintings and sculptures.

The feast day of the venerated image is celebrated annually on December 1, after the feast of Saint Andrew. Her secondary feast is observed on Thursday after Pentecost Sunday.

== Clergy ==
| Name | Years serving | Present assignment |
|---|---|---|
| Alfredo M. Sta. Ana | 1975 – 1987 | Deceased |
| Mariano T. Balbago Jr. | 1987 – 1997 | St. Joseph Catholic Church, Beltsville, Maryland |
| Generoso A. Mediarito | 1997 – 2006 | Diocesan Shrine and Parish of St. Pio of Pietrelcina, Antipolo |
| Arnel F. Lagarejos | 2006 – 2013 | relieved |
| Neil Vincent M. Tacbas | 2013 – 2016 | Binangonan Catholic College |
| Nolly C. Buco | 2016 – 2019 | Roman Catholic Diocese of Catarman |
| Aly A. Barcinal | 2019 – 2025 | Diocesan Shrine and Parish of St. Clement, Angono |
| Alexander V. Enhaynes | 2025 – present | |

== Gallery ==
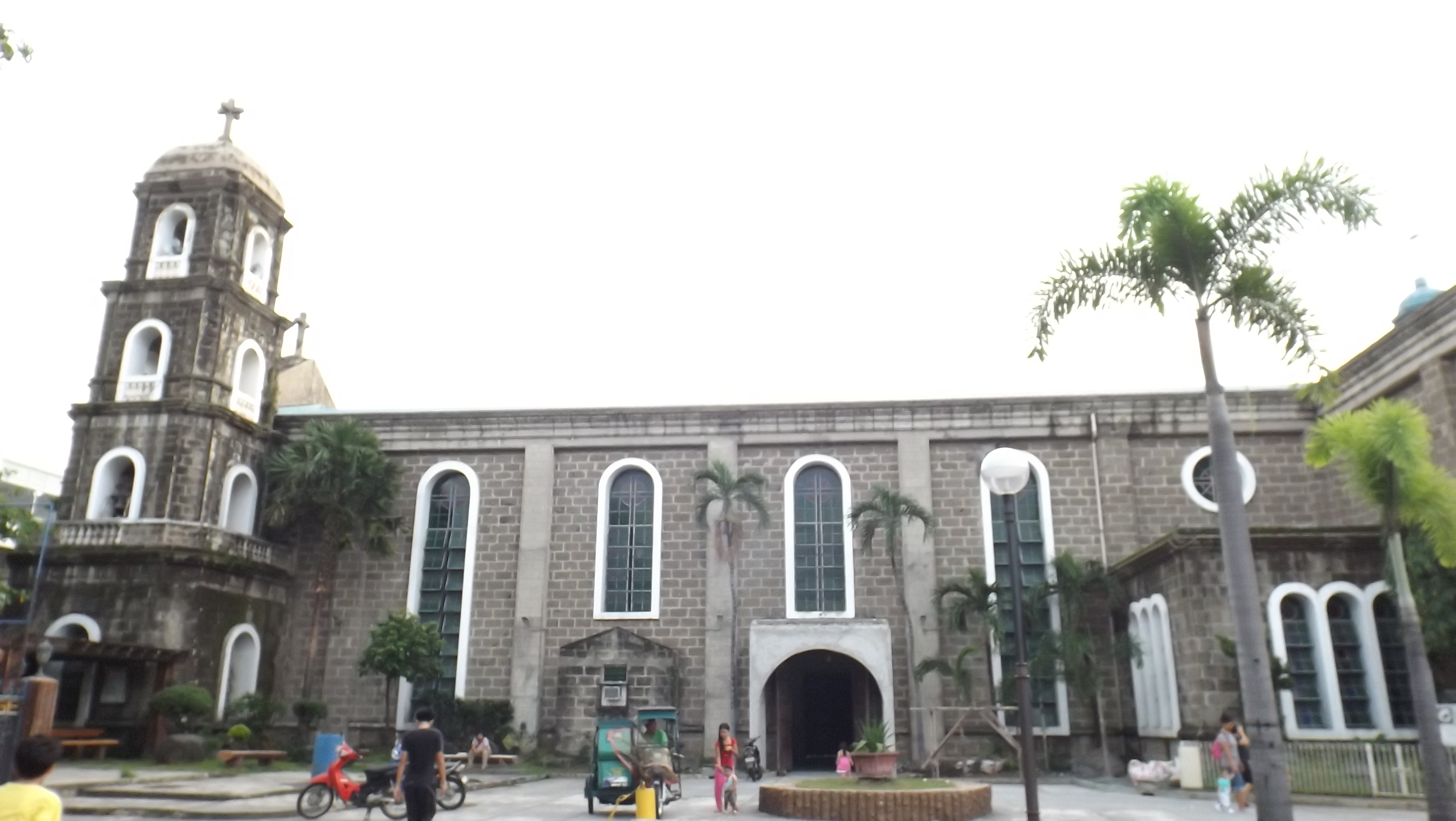
Side wall

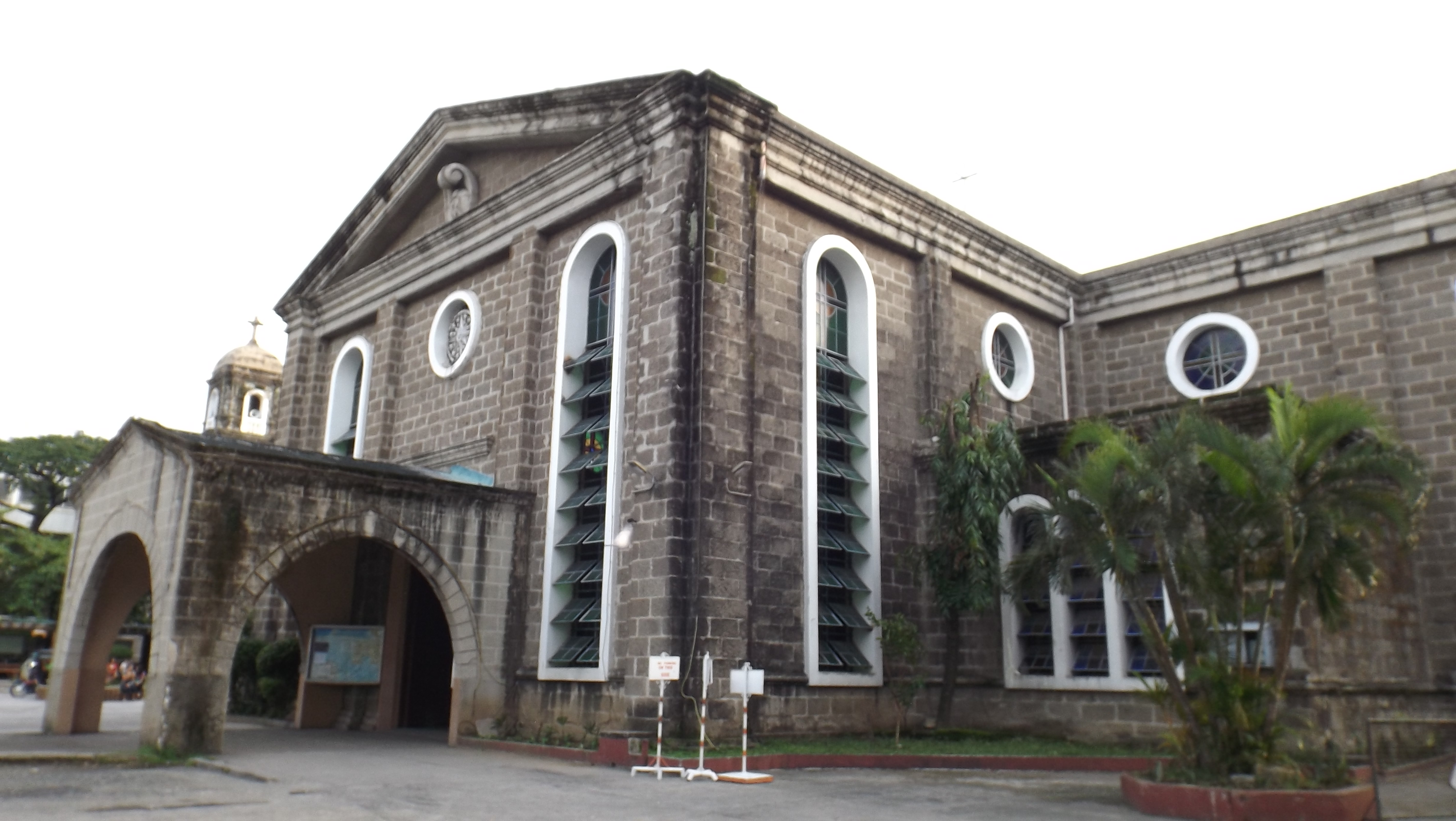
Church transept

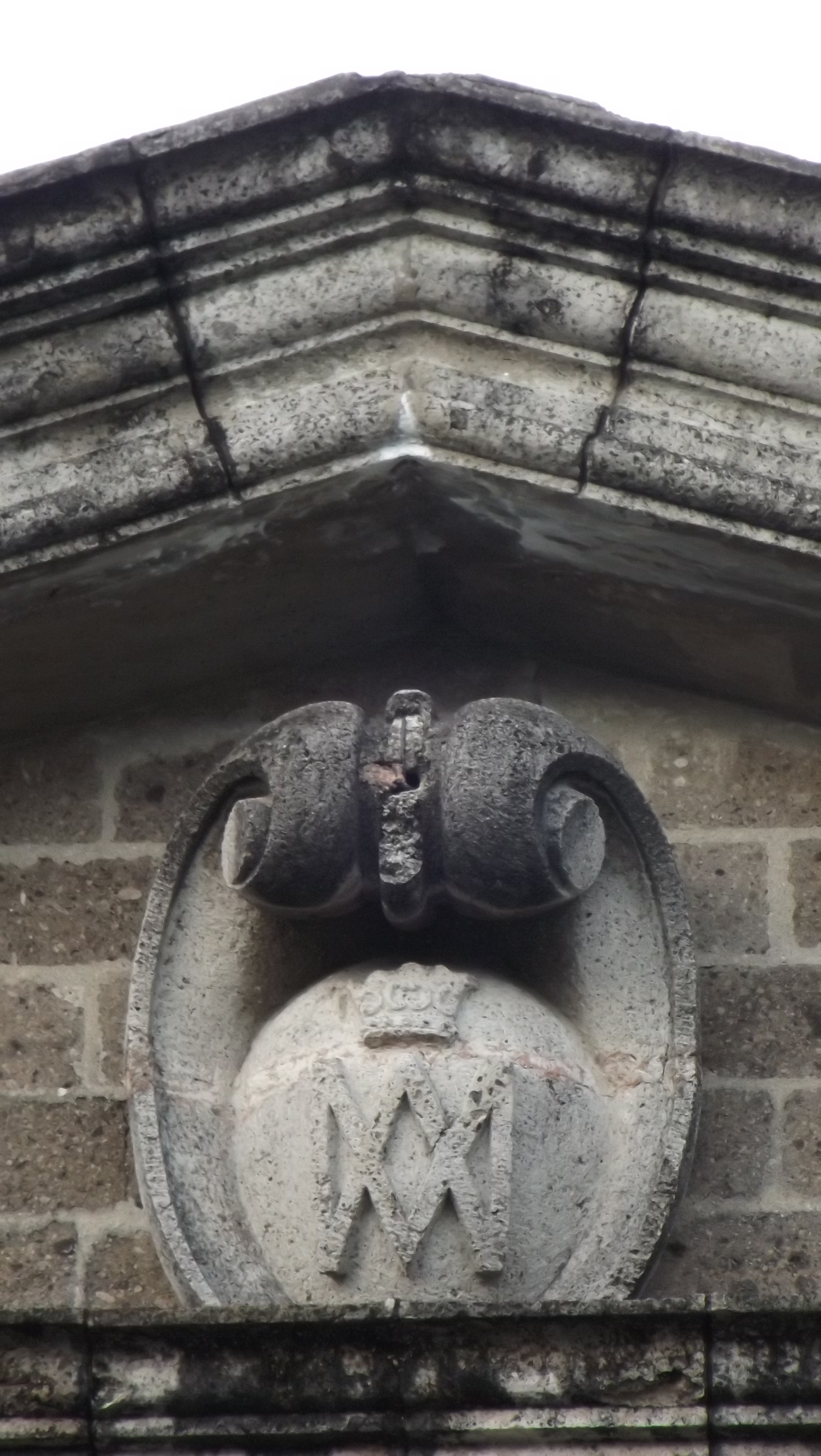
Apex of the transept pediment

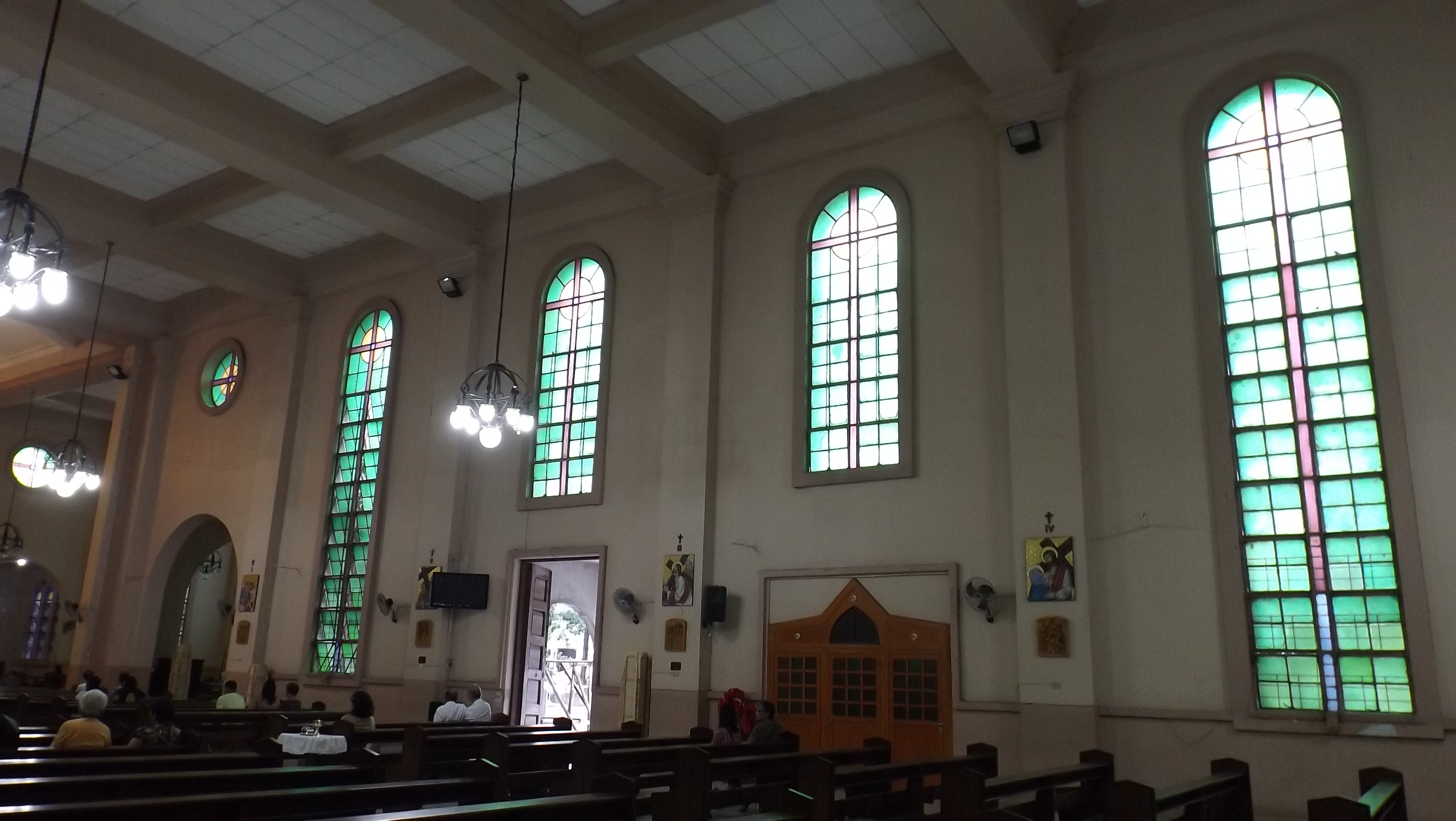
Inside the church, showing the bays (right portion)

== See also ==
- John Paul II Minor Seminary
- Nuestra Señora de la Luz (disambiguation)
- Our Lady of Light (disambiguation)
- Our Lady of Zeitoun
- Diocesan Shrine and Parish of St. Joseph

== Other sources ==
- The Official Website of the Municipality of Cainta
- The Roman Catholic Diocese of Antipolo
- Cainta Catholic College
- "Our Lady of Light", The Marian Library/International Marian Research Institute, University of Dayton.
