= Mitsubishi Motors Philippines =

Automotive manufacturer in the Philippines

Coordinates: 14.5821°N 121.1307°E

Mitsubishi Motors Philippines Corporation
- Formerly: Philippine Automotive Manufacturing Corporation (1987–1996)
- Type: Subsidiary
- Industry: Automotive
- Predecessor: Chrysler Philippines Corporation (1963–1978); Canlubang Automotive Resources Corporation (1978–1987)
- Founded: 1963 (as Chrysler Philippines Corporation); 1987 (as Philippine Automotive Manufacturing Corporation)
- Headquarters: Head office: 21st Floor, EcoTower Building, 32nd corner 9th Street, Bonifacio Global City, Taguig City, Philippines; Main factory: No. 1 Auto Park Ave., Greenfield Automotive Park Special Economic Zone, Santa Rosa, Laguna, Philippines
- Key people: Ritsu Imaeda, President & CEO; Noriaki Hirakata, Chairman
- Products: Automobiles, SUVs, Pickup Trucks, Trucks, Minibuses
- Number of employees: c. 1,700 (June 2022)
- Parent: Mitsubishi Motors (100%)
- Subsidiaries: Asian Transmission Corp. (ATC, sold to Mitsubishi Motors in 100% from MMPC); Mitsubishi Motors Properties, Inc.
- Website: www.mitsubishi-motors.com.ph

Mitsubishi Motors Philippines Corporation (MMPC) (formerly Philippine Automotive Manufacturing Corporation) is the Philippine operation of Mitsubishi Motors Corporation (MMC), where it is the second-biggest seller of automobiles. MMPC is one of MMC's four manufacturing facilities outside Japan, and currently produces the Mitsubishi Mirage, Mirage G4, and the L300. From 1987 to 2018, MMPC was the distributor of Mitsubishi Fuso commercial vehicles in the Philippines until Sojitz Fuso Philippines Corporation was established in September 2018. The company's slogan is "Drive your Ambition", which has been part of Mitsubishi Motors' global rebranding since 2018.

The company was incorporated in 1987 as Philippine Automotive Manufacturing Corporation (PAMCOR) and was renamed Mitsubishi Motors Philippines Corporation (MMPC) in 1996.

== History ==
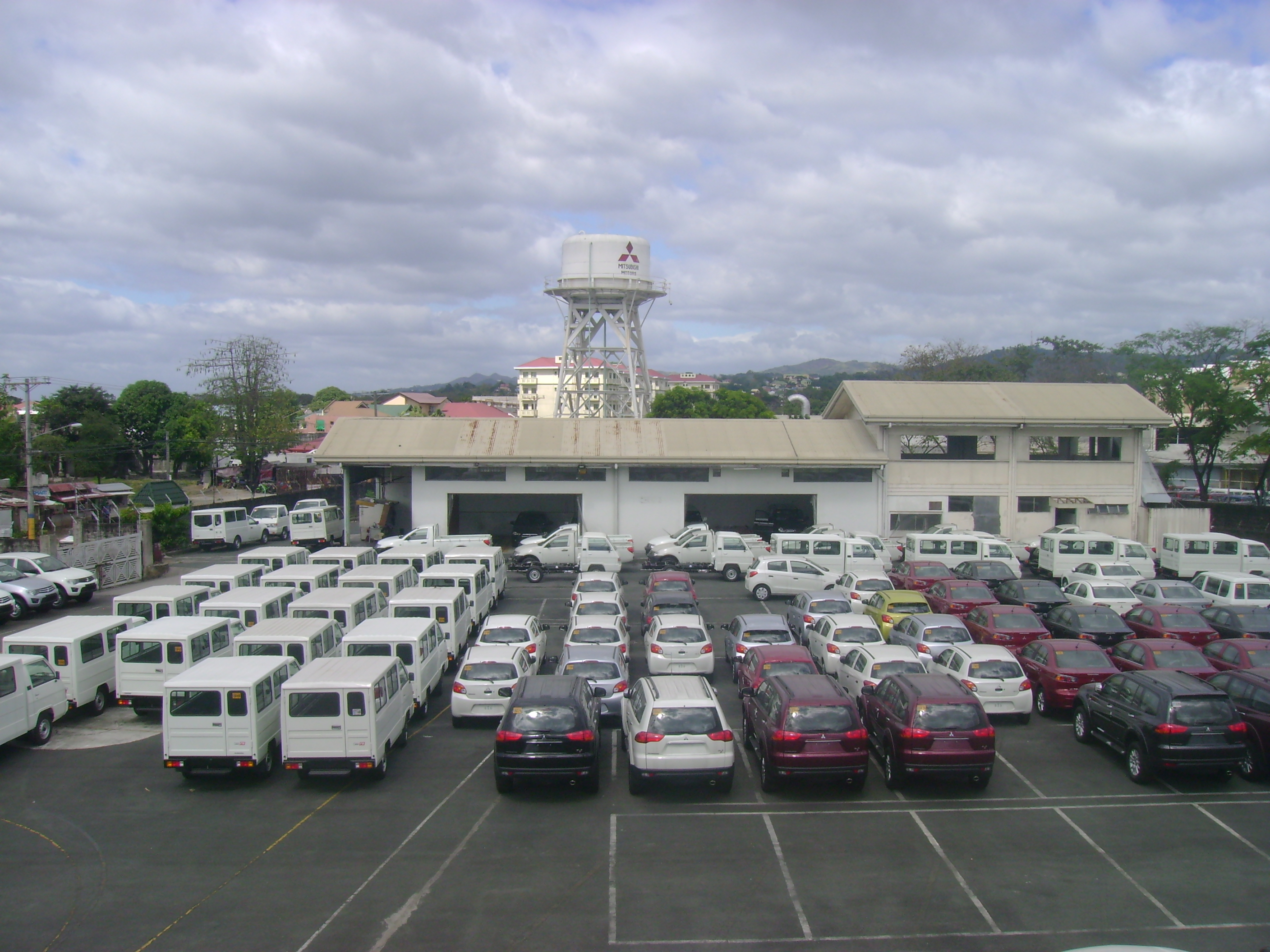
Former Mitsubishi Motors plant in Cainta, Rizal from 1963 to 2014, also markets the L300, Lancer EX, Mirage and Montero Sport before it transferred its production site to its current location in Santa Rosa, Laguna in 2015. (today a mixed-use development site of Sierra Valley Gardens since 2020).

The company's predecessor, Canlubang Automotive Resources Corporation (CARCO), was originally established as Chrysler Philippines Corporation in 1963 as the assembler and distributor of Chrysler, Dodge and Plymouth cars in the Philippines. In May 1972, C. J. Yulo & Sons acquired 65% interest in Chrysler Philippines Corporation, with the balance 35% being acquired by Mitsubishi Motors Corporation (MMC) and Nissho Iwai Corporation (now Sojitz Corporation). In 1974, the company introduced Mitsubishi cars in the Philippines. In 1978, the company was renamed Canlubang Automotive Resources Corporation (CARCO). In 1985, MMC and Nissho Iwai Corporation (now known as Sojitz Corporation) acquired full ownership of CARCO from the Yulo group.

In January 1987, Philippine Automotive Manufacturing Corporation (PAMCOR) was incorporated by MMC and Nissho Iwai to formally take over the operations and business activities of CARCO. In April 1996, MMC became the majority shareholder (51%) of PAMCOR after it acquired 1% of Nissho Iwai's share in the company. In August 1996, PAMCOR was renamed Mitsubishi Motors Philippines Corporation (MMPC).

On June 1, 2018, Sojitz Corporation (formerly Nissho Iwai Corporation) completed its divestment from MMPC with the acquisition of its 49% stake in MMPC by MMC. As a result, MMPC becomes a 100% wholly owned subsidiary of MMC.

On November 22, 2018, Mitsubishi Fuso Truck and Bus Corporation announced that Sojitz Fuso Philippines Corporation would take over from MMPC as the general distributor of Fuso products in the Philippines effective the first quarter of 2019.

In February 2020, MMPC moved its offices (including sales and marketing, government affairs, service, parts, accessories and finance on personnel) to EcoTower Building in Bonifacio Global City, Taguig.

In July 2020, the company produced the 200,000th unit of their best-selling L300 truck, and it will be exported to other Southeast Asian countries, particularly in Indonesia, starting in 2022.

== Asian Transmission Corporation ==
MMPC owns a subsidiary, Asian Transmission Corp. (ATC), located in Calamba, Laguna since its establishment in 1973, which produces auto components. Asian Transmission Corporation was sold to Mitsubishi Motors of Japan from MMPC.

== Real estate venture ==
Mitsubishi Motors Properties, Mitsubishi Motors Philippines' property development and real estate arm, the company develops large-scale, mixed-use, planned communities incorporating residential, commercial, educational, and leisure components. It provides other services such as project design, construction oversight, and property management.

== Divisions and subsidiaries ==
- Asian Transmission Corporation (ATC)
- Mitsubishi Motors Properties, Inc. (MMPI)

== Production and sales ==
Year	Lancer	Adventure	L300 Delica	L200 Strada	Total production	Domestic sales
2000	1,880	6,729	2,918	1,577	13,104	15,285
2001	2,574	7,714	2,079	1,253	13,620	16,367
2002	1,294	7,742	2,925	1,166	13,127	15,231
2003	—	3,921	3,529	692	8,142	13,912
2004	—	5,868	2,826	361	9,055	12,483
2005	—	5,876	3,685	5	9,566	11,845
2006	—	4,560	3,992	—	8,552	12,485
2007	—	6,033	4,580	—	10,613	14,878

(sources: Facts & Figures 2005, Facts & Figures 2008, Mitsubishi Motors website)

== Vehicles ==
=== Current products ===
- Destinator (2025–present) – Imported from Indonesia
- L300 (1987–2017, 2019–present) – Locally produced
- Mirage (2012–present) – Imported from Thailand until 2016 then locally produced
  - Mirage G4 (2013–present) – Imported from Thailand until 2016 then locally produced
- Montero Sport (2001–2005, 2008–present) – Imported from Thailand
- Outlander (2007–2012, 2024–2025, 2026–present) – Imported from Japan
- Triton (1978–present) – Locally produced until 2005 then imported from Thailand
- Versa (2026–present) – Imported from Japan
- Xforce (2024–present) – Imported from Indonesia
- Xpander (2018–present) – Imported from Indonesia

=== Former products ===
- Adventure (1997–2017) – Locally produced
- ASX (2011–2017) – Imported from Japan
- Eclipse (1997–2011) – Imported from United States
- Endeavor (2007–2011) – Imported from United States
- Fuzion (2007–2016) – Locally produced from 2007 to 2014 then imported from Taiwan from 2014 to 2016
- Galant (1973–2012) – Locally produced from 1973 to 2006 then imported from Taiwan from 2006 to 2012
- Grandis (2005–2011) – Imported from Japan
- Lancer (1976–2017) – Locally produced and imported from Japan and Thailand
  - Lancer Evolution (2005–2011) – Imported from Japan
- L300 Exceed Van (1997–2005) – Locally produced
- Pajero (1986–2021) – Locally produced from 1986 to 2008 then imported from Japan from 2006 to 2021
- Space Gear (1998–2008) – Locally produced
- Space Wagon (1992–1999) – Locally produced

==== Fuso commercial vehicles (transferred to Sojitz Fuso Philippines) ====
- Fuso Canter
- Mitsubishi Fuso FK/FL/FM
- Fuso FI
- Fuso FJ
- Rosa
- Fuso FP/FV

All Mitsubishi Fuso products was transferred to the newly formed Sojitz Fuso Philippines Corporation, the general distributor of Fuso commercial vehicles in the Philippines.
