= Our Lady of Light Cathedral, Guarabira =

Our Lady of Light Cathedral
- Catedral Nossa Senhora da Luz
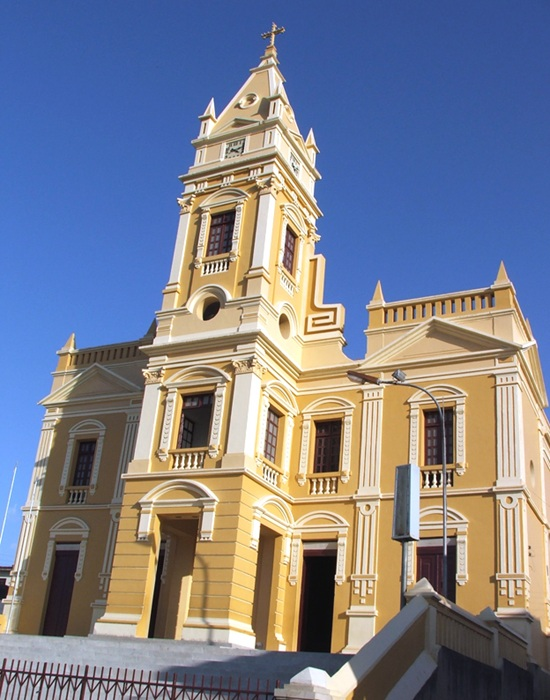
- Our Lady of Light Cathedral
- Location: Guarabira
- Country: Brazil
- Denomination: Roman Catholic Church

The Our Lady of Light Cathedral (Portuguese: Catedral Nossa Senhora da Luz) Also Guarabira Cathedral Is the name given to a religious building affiliated with the Catholic Church in the municipality of Guarabira, in the state of Paraíba. It is the main temple of the Diocese of Guarabira in Brazil.

By provincial decree on April 27, 1837, the parish of Our Lady of Light was built, owned by the Archdiocese of North Parahyba.

On 10 October 1980, with Bull "Cum Exoparet" and the canonical erection of the diocese of Guarabira, the Parish of Our Lady of Light was elevated to the dignity of a cathedral.

The beginning of the present building dates from 1857 in a Renaissance architecture, and in 1981,it underwent a renovation that left a sample of a classic and modern architecture. It is located in the center of Guarabira.

Inside, it houses an image of Christ and the patroness of Our Lady of Light that dates back to 1884, a Via Crucis and a tabernacle all carved in wood.

== See also ==
- Roman Catholicism in Brazil
