= List of magazines in the Philippines =

This is a list of magazines in the Philippines.

== Local titles ==
- Art+ Magazine
- AutoIndustriya.com
- Bannawag
- BluPrint
- LifeStyle Asia
- Mega
- Metro
- Modern Parenting
- Philippines Graphic
- Philippines Graphic Reader
- Preview
- Scout
- Gen-Z
- The Business Manual
- The Game
- Top Gear Philippines
- Woman's Journal
- Yes!
- Culture Crash Comics (defunct, 2000-2004)
- Ilustración Filipina (defunct, 1859-1860)

== International titles ==
- Allure Philippines
- Autocar Philippines
- Billboard Philippines
- Esquire Philippines
- L'Officiel Philippines
  - L'Officiel Hommes Philippines
- Nylon n̩Manila
- Rolling Stone Philippines
- Tatler Philippines
- VMan Southeast Asia
- Vogue Philippines
- Vogue Man Philippines
