= Nanqu =

Nanqu or Nan Qu may refer to

- Nánqǔ (南曲), another name for Nanguan music
- Nanqu Subdistrict, Zhongshan
- South District, Taichung
- South District, Tainan

== See also ==
- Minami-ku (disambiguation), districts in Japan with similar names
- Nam-gu (disambiguation), districts in South Korea with similar names
