= Mitsubishi Xpander =

MPV manufactured by Mitsubishi Motors

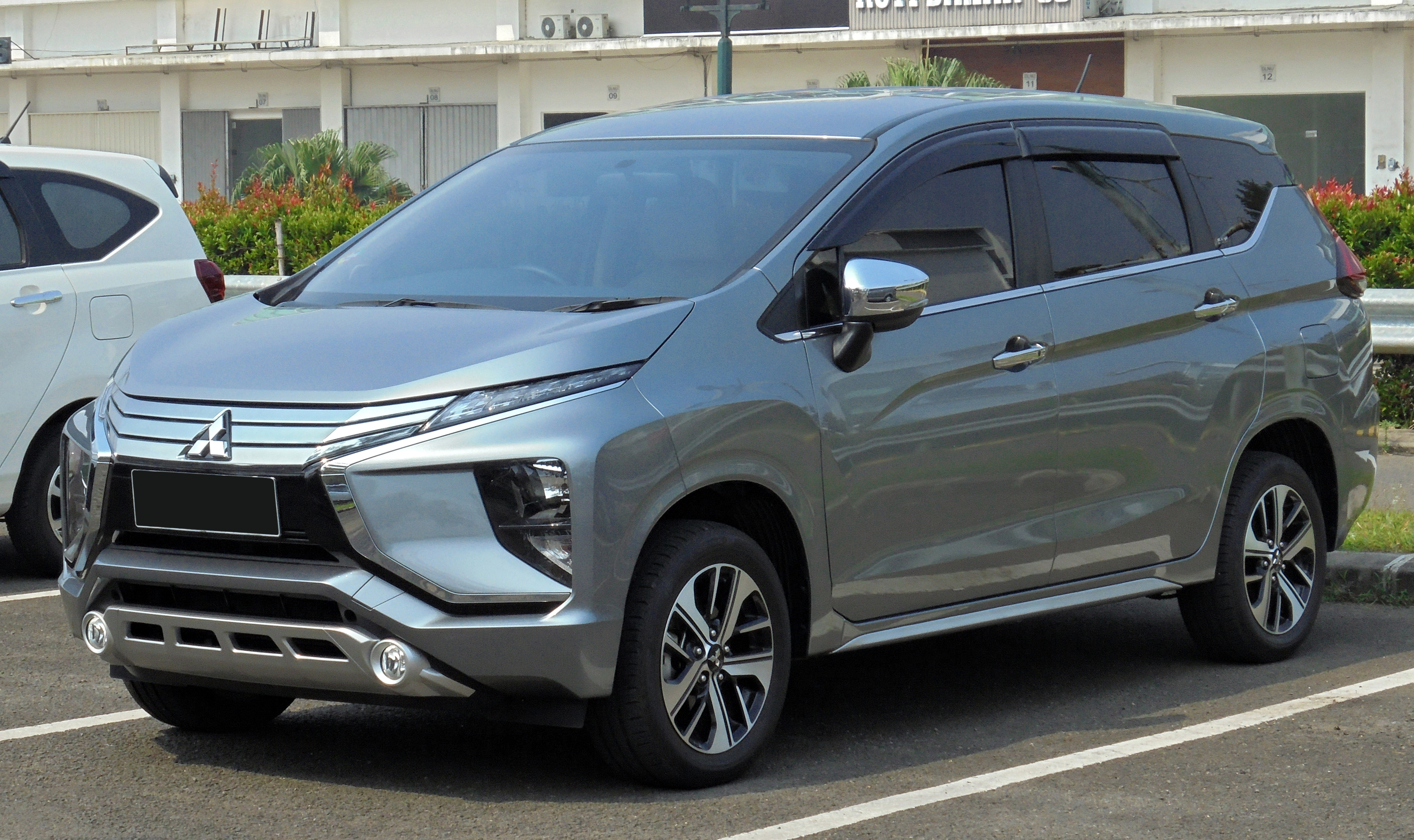
- 2018 Mitsubishi Xpander Ultimate (NC1W; pre-facelift, Indonesia)

Overview
- Manufacturer: Mitsubishi Motors
- Model code: NC1W; NC2W; NE3W (hybrid)
- Also called: Nissan Livina (2019–present)
- Production: August 2017 – present
- Assembly: Indonesia: Cikarang, West Java (MMKI); Malaysia: Pekan, Pahang (HICOM); Thailand: Laem Chabang (MMTh, HEV); Vietnam: Dĩ An, Bình Dương (MMV); Bangladesh: Gazipur (Rancon Auto)
- Designer: List: Shuichiro Yamamoto (pre-facelift and facelift); Naoki Akita (pre-facelift); Atsushi Toyoda, Naoya Ashida, Shinya Nishikado, Toshihiko Okamoto and Park Jinmin (facelift); Hiroshi Noguchi (pre-facelift Xpander Cross); Park Jinmin, Naoya Ashida, Yuichiro Ishizuka and Shigeru Yuzawa (facelift Xpander Cross); Shingo Nishiyama (pre-facelift interior)

Body and chassis
- Class: Compact MPV
- Body style: 5-door wagon
- Layout: Front-engine, front-wheel-drive
- Related: Mitsubishi Destinator; Mitsubishi Xforce

Powertrain
- Engine: Petrol: 1.5 L 4A91 MIVEC I4; Petrol hybrid: 1.6 L 4A92 MIVEC I4
- Power output: 77 kW (103 hp; 105 PS); 70 kW (94 hp; 95 PS) (HEV)
- Transmission: 5-speed manual; 4-speed automatic; CVT
- Hybrid drivetrain: Power-split (HEV)
- Battery: 1.1 kWh lithium-ion (HEV)

Dimensions
- Wheelbase: 2,775 mm (109.3 in)
- Length: 4,475 mm (176.2 in) (pre-facelift Xpander); 4,500 mm (177.2 in) (pre-facelift Xpander Cross); 4,595 mm (180.9 in) (facelift)
- Width: 1,750 mm (68.9 in); 1,790–1,800 mm (70.5–70.9 in) (Xpander Cross)
- Height: 1,695–1,700 mm (66.7–66.9 in); 1,750 mm (68.9 in) (Xpander Cross and facelift)
- Kerb weight: 1,220–1,275 kg (2,690–2,811 lb)

Chronology
- Predecessor: Mitsubishi Freeca; Mitsubishi Fuzion (Philippines)

The Mitsubishi Xpander is a compact multi-purpose vehicle (MPV) manufactured by Mitsubishi Motors since 2017. Prominently marketed as a "crossover MPV", the vehicle was introduced in July 2017 in Indonesia, where the vehicle was manufactured and sold as a high-volume model. Introductions in other markets started since 2018, and the vehicle is mainly sold in emerging countries in Southeast Asia along with several Latin American, African and Middle Eastern markets. It was the fourth best-selling Mitsubishi Motors model globally in 2018 and 2019, and became its third best-selling model in 2021.

In late 2019, a more rugged-looking variant was introduced as the Xpander Cross. A rebadged and redesigned variant of the Xpander, with mainly different front and rear fascias, is sold by Nissan as the second-generation Livina since February 2019.

== Overview ==
The vehicle design was previewed by the XM Concept that was first displayed at the 24th Gaikindo Indonesia International Auto Show in August 2016. The official teaser images of the car were revealed on the Mitsubishi Motors website on 17 July 2017. The car was unveiled in Jakarta on 24 July 2017 and debuted on 10 August 2017 at the 25th Gaikindo Indonesia International Auto Show. The car went on sale in Indonesia on 3 October 2017.

Classified as a "Small Crossover MPV" by the carmaker, the design of the Xpander is claimed to be inspired by crossover SUVs and adopted the then-recent Dynamic Shield design philosophy.

The vehicle has been exported throughout Southeast Asia, Nepal, Bolivia, Peru, Bangladesh, Egypt, the Middle East, Sri Lanka, South Africa, and Mexico. A sub-model called the Xpander Cross has been available as a more rugged-looking variant of the vehicle since November 2019.

The Xpander is manufactured in Indonesia at the Mitsubishi Motors Krama Yudha Indonesia (MMKI) plant, and has also been assembled by kits by Mitsubishi Motors Vietnam since July 2020, and by DRB-HICOM in Malaysia since September 2020. To meet the unexpectedly high demand, the MMKI plant increased the production output from 5,000 to 10,000 units per month by early 2018. 104,000 units were sold globally in 2018, followed by 114,000 units sold in 2019, higher than the initial annual target of 80,000 units. Since early 2024, Mitsubishi started producing the Xpander HEV at the Mitsubishi Motors Thailand (MMTh) plant solely to supply the Thailand market, in order to take advantage of the country's tax incentive programme for hybrid vehicles.

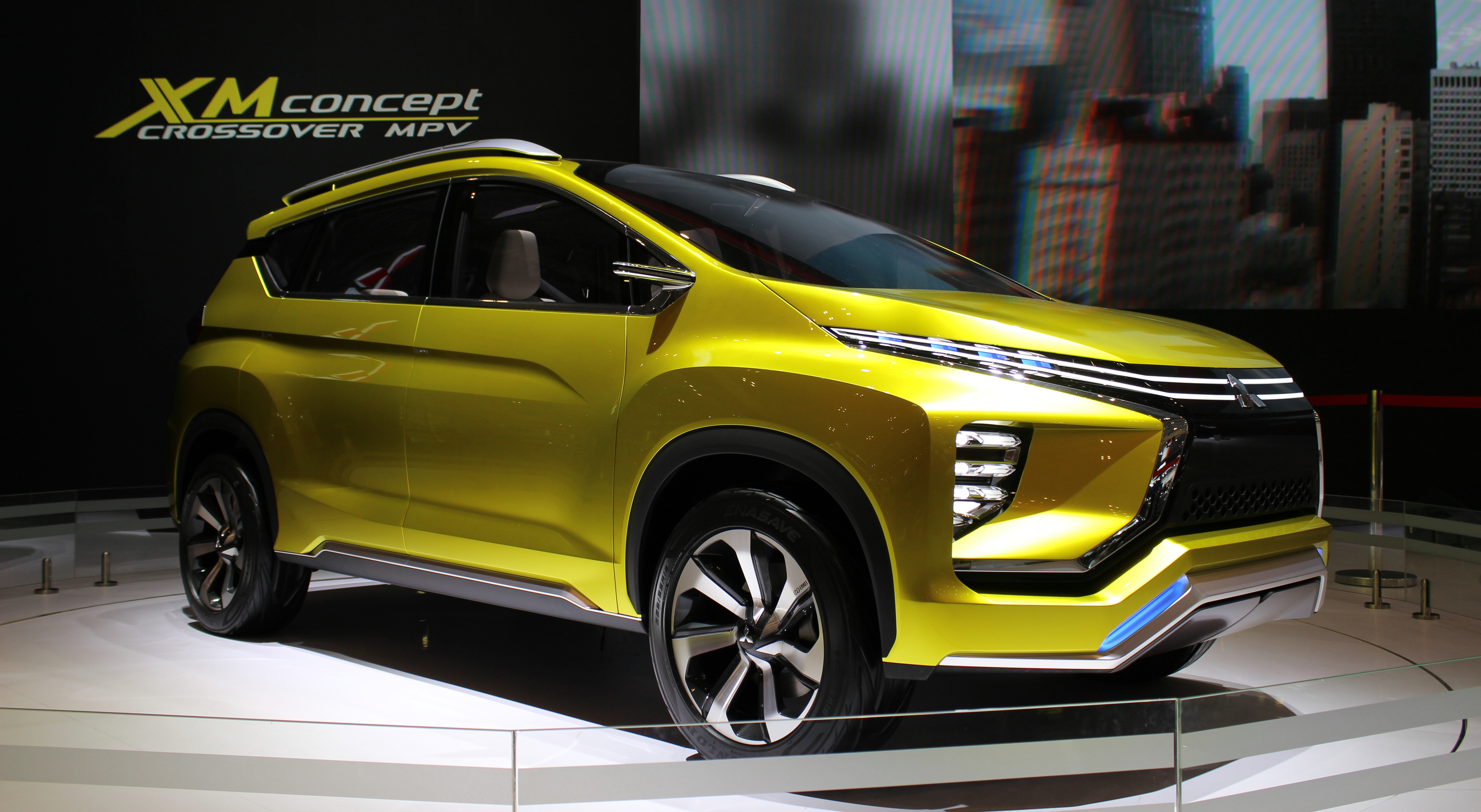
Mitsubishi XM Concept, which previewed the Xpander

=== Pre-facelift ===
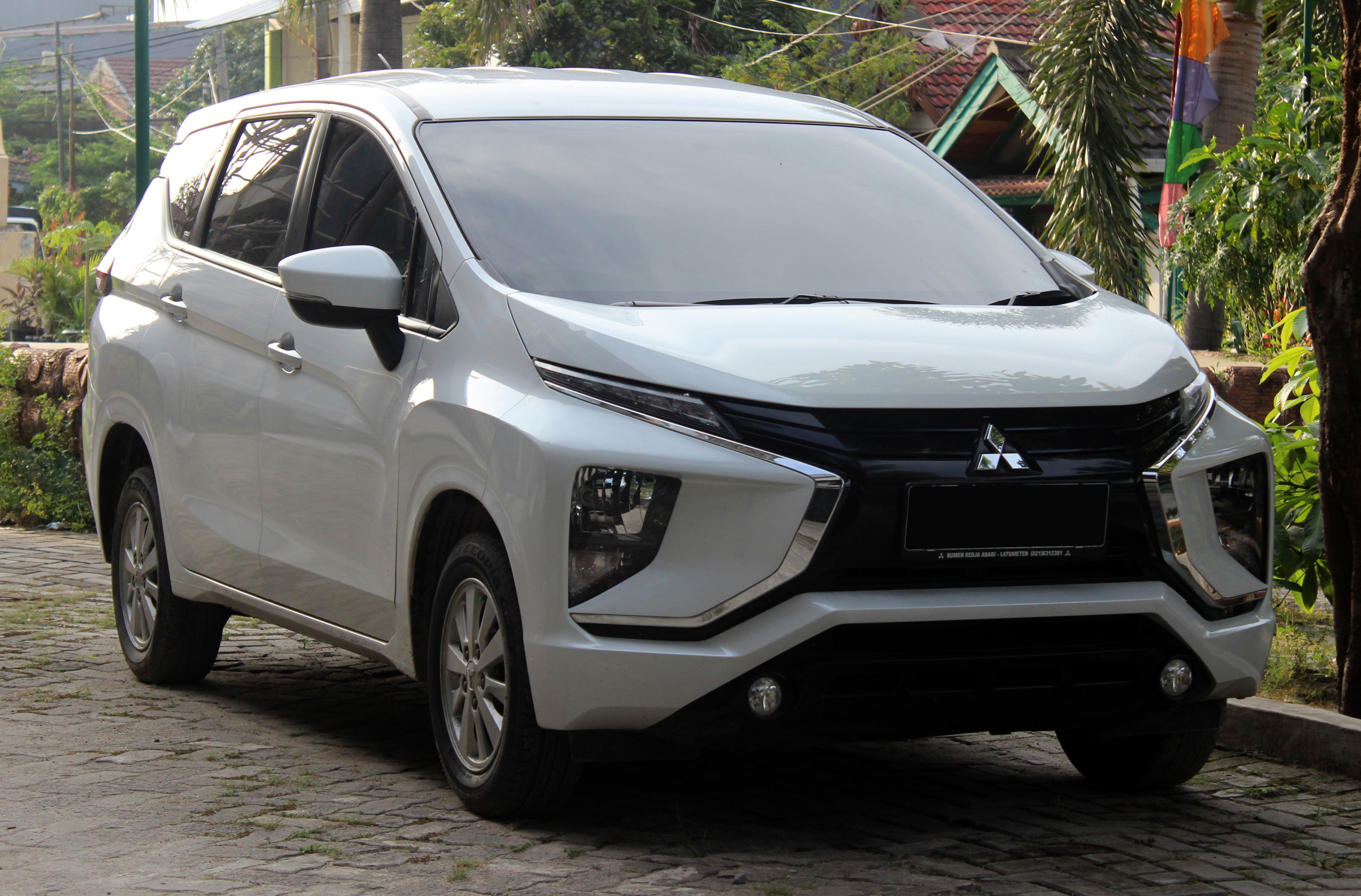
2017 Xpander GLS (Indonesia; front view)

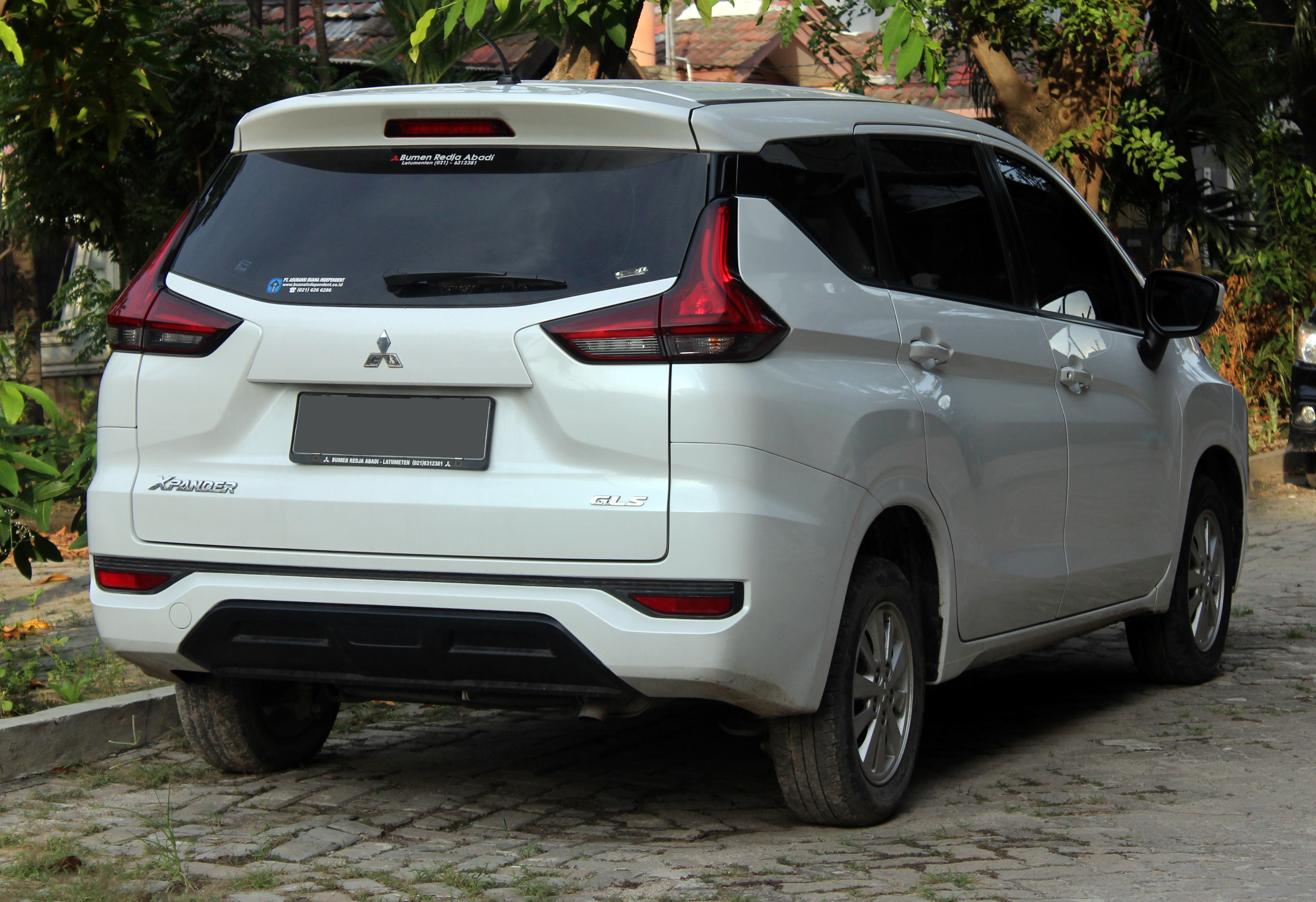
2017 Xpander GLS (Indonesia; rear view)

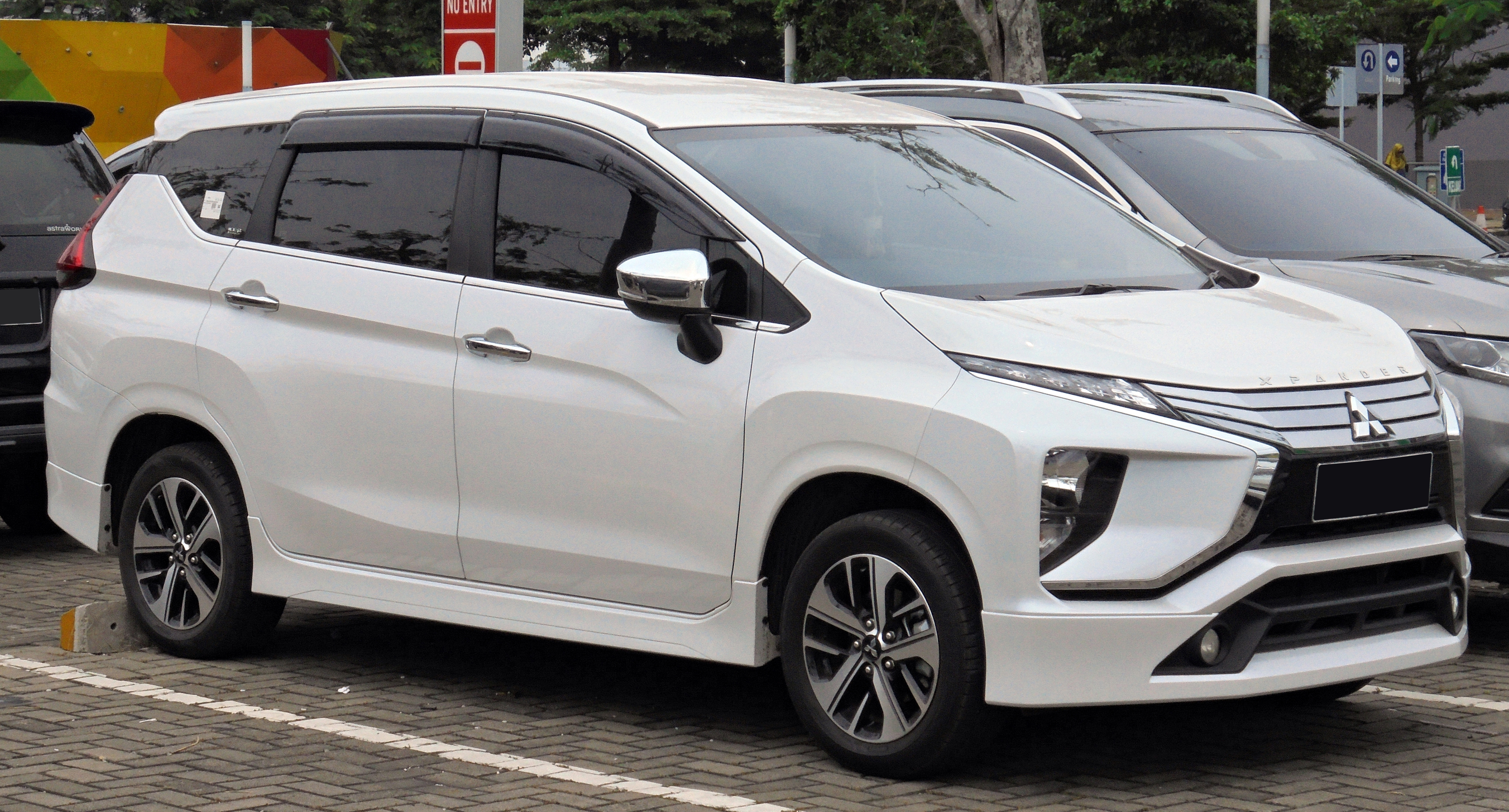
2018 Xpander Ultimate with optional aero kits (Indonesia)

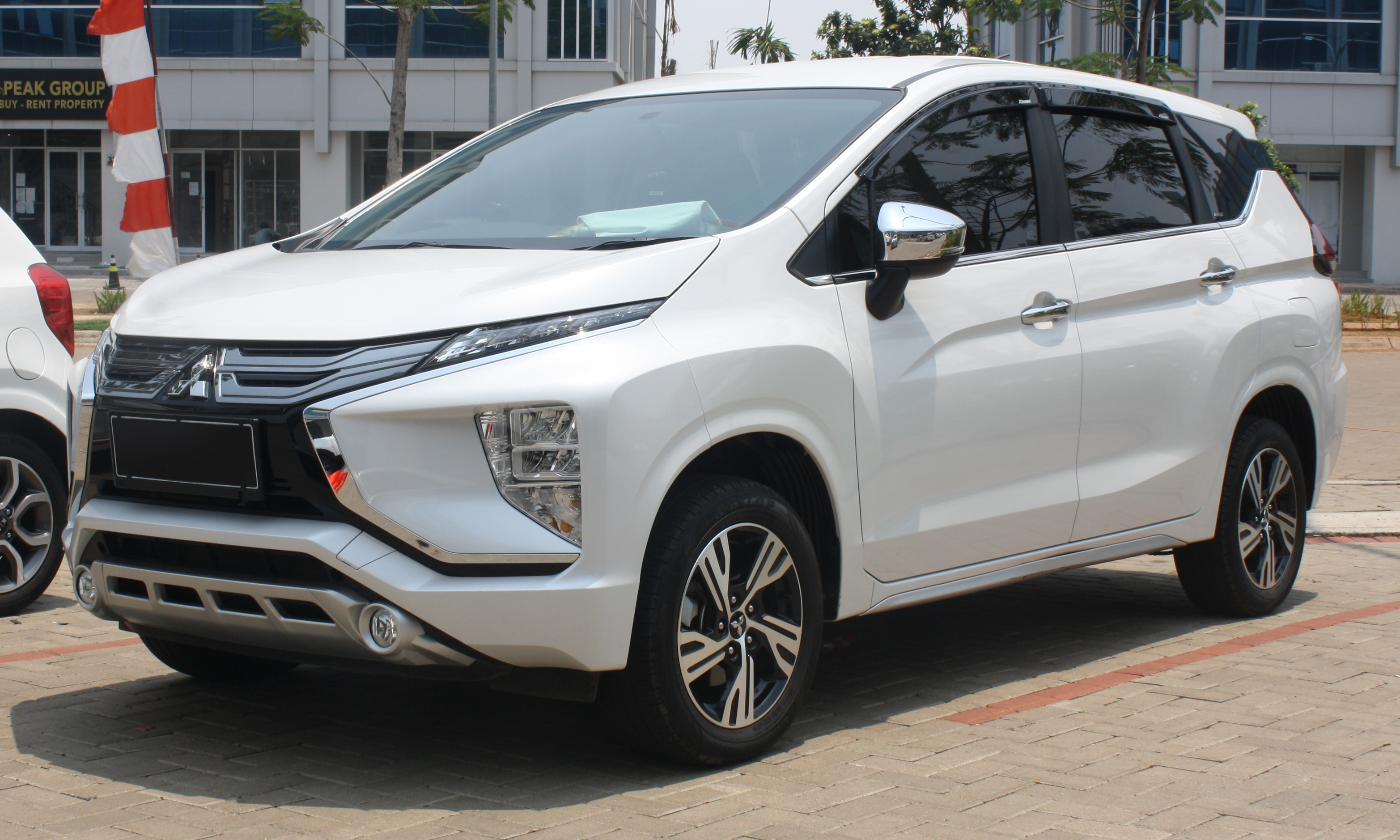
2021 Xpander Ultimate (Indonesia)

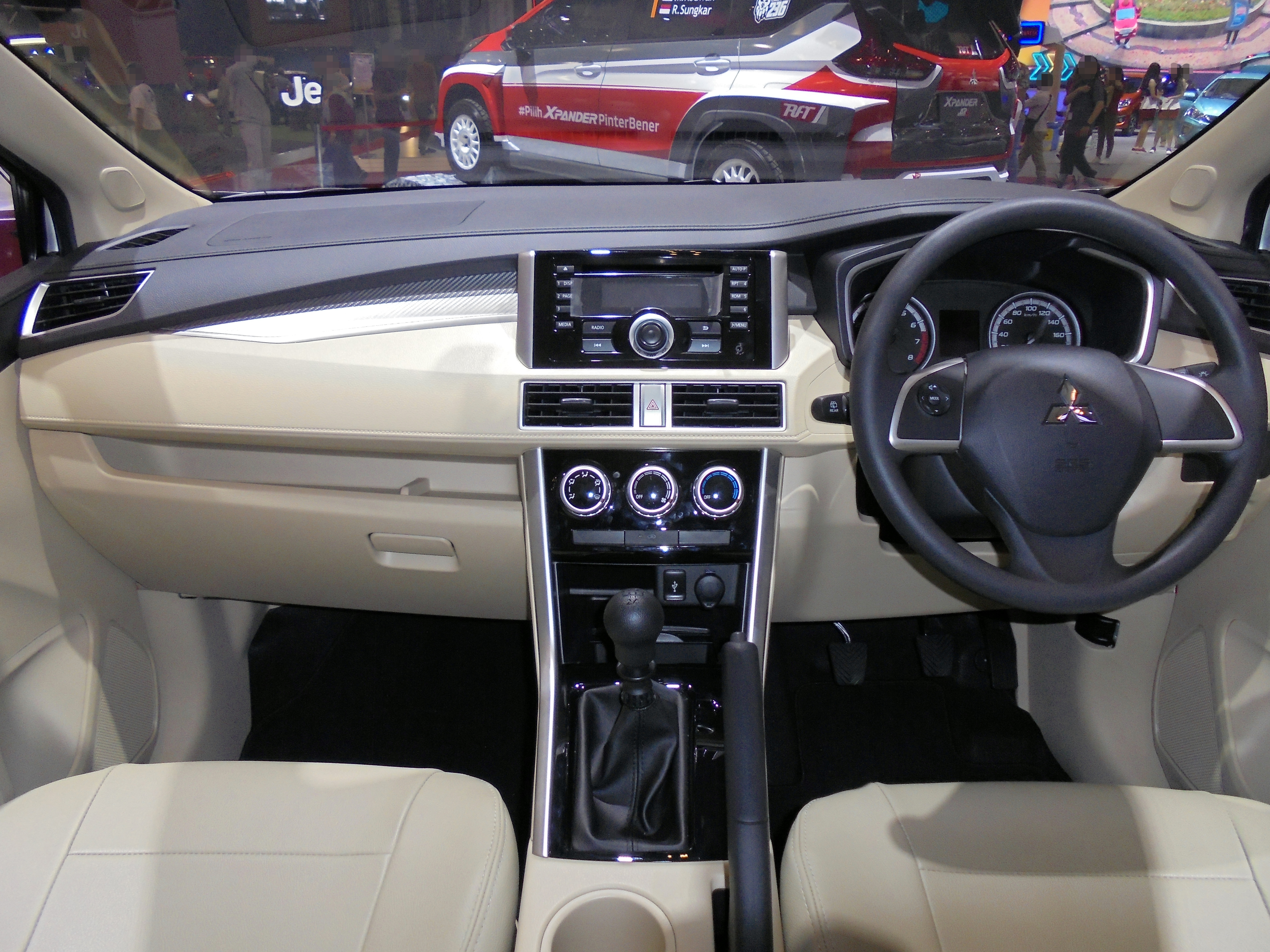
2019 Xpander Exceed interior (Indonesia)

=== First facelift ===
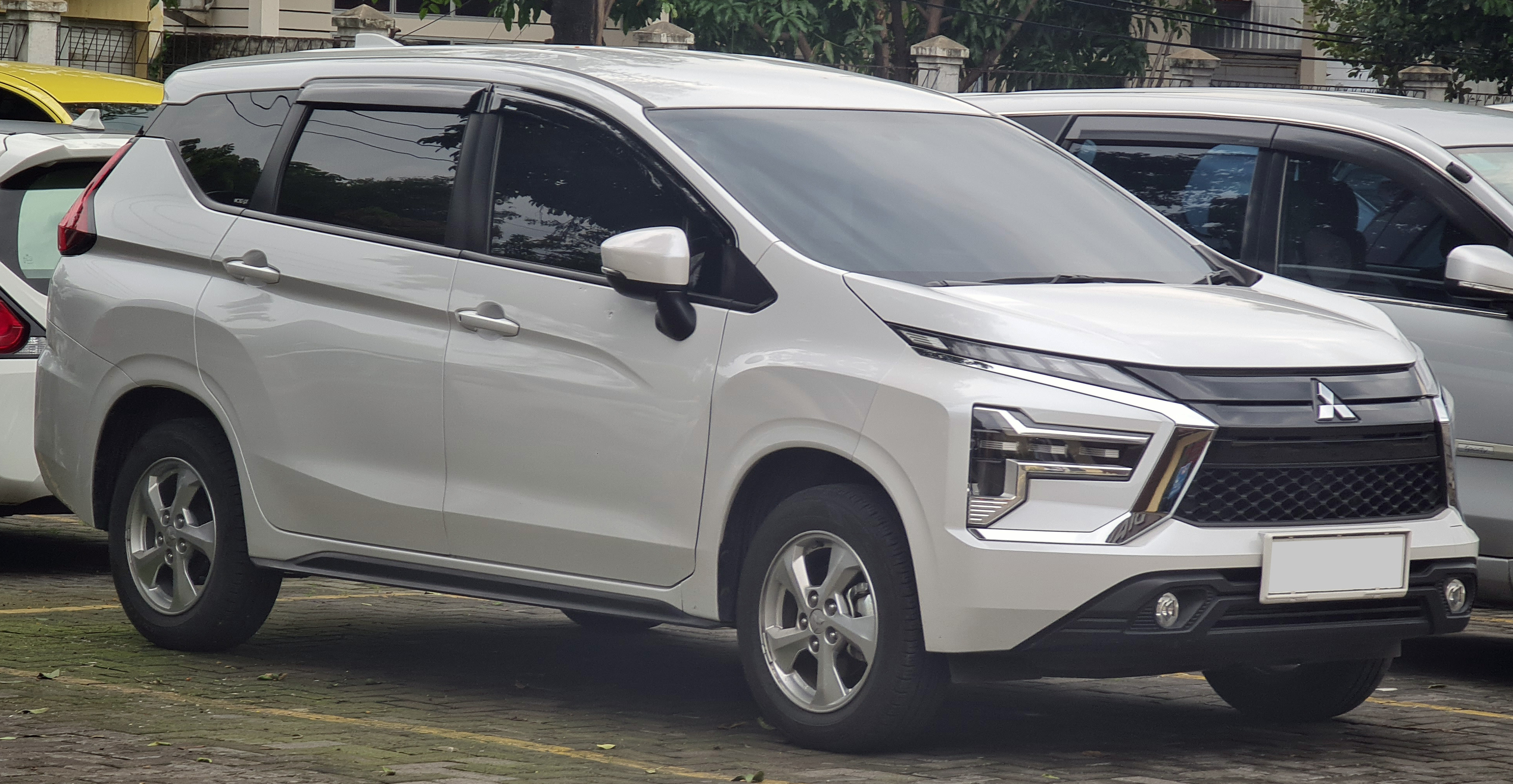
2024 Xpander Exceed (Indonesia)

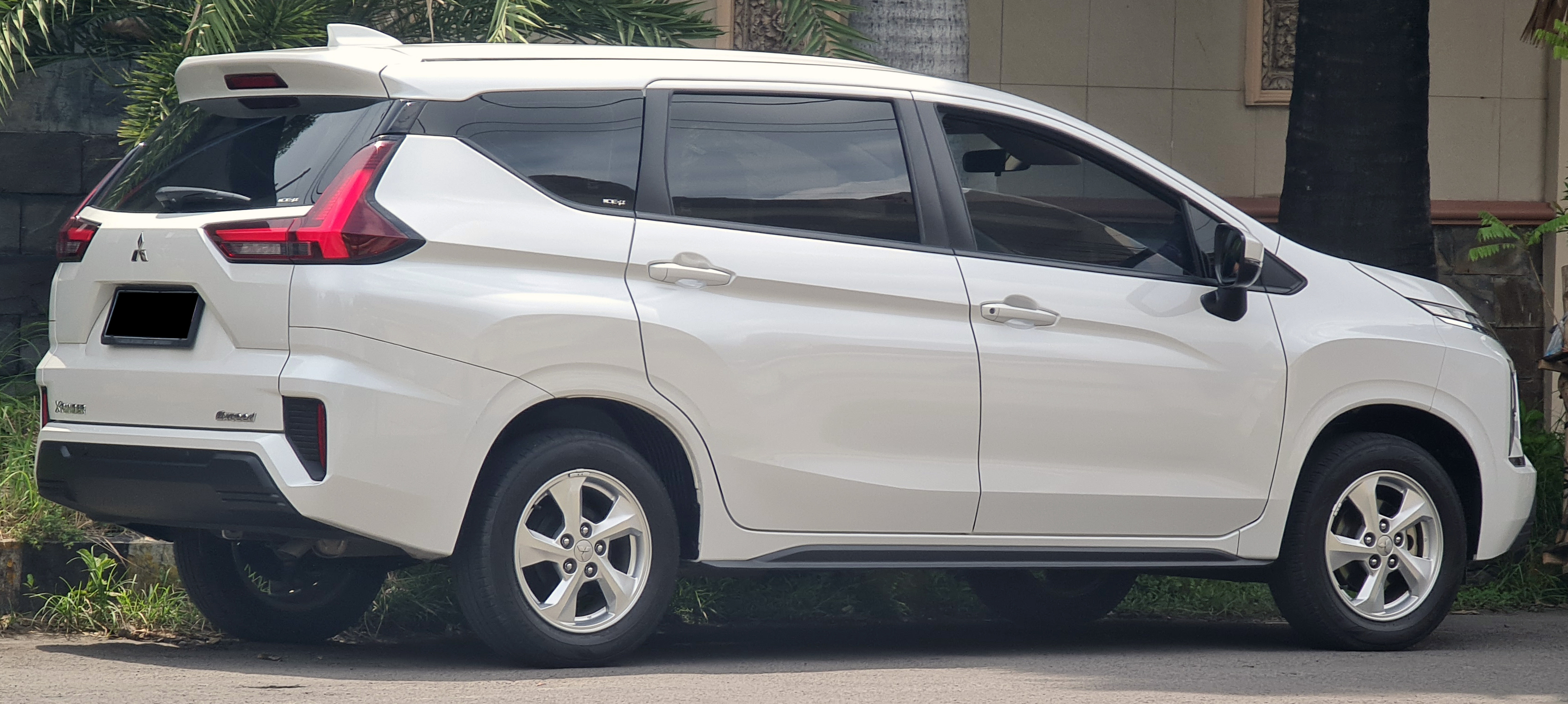
2022 Xpander Exceed (Indonesia)

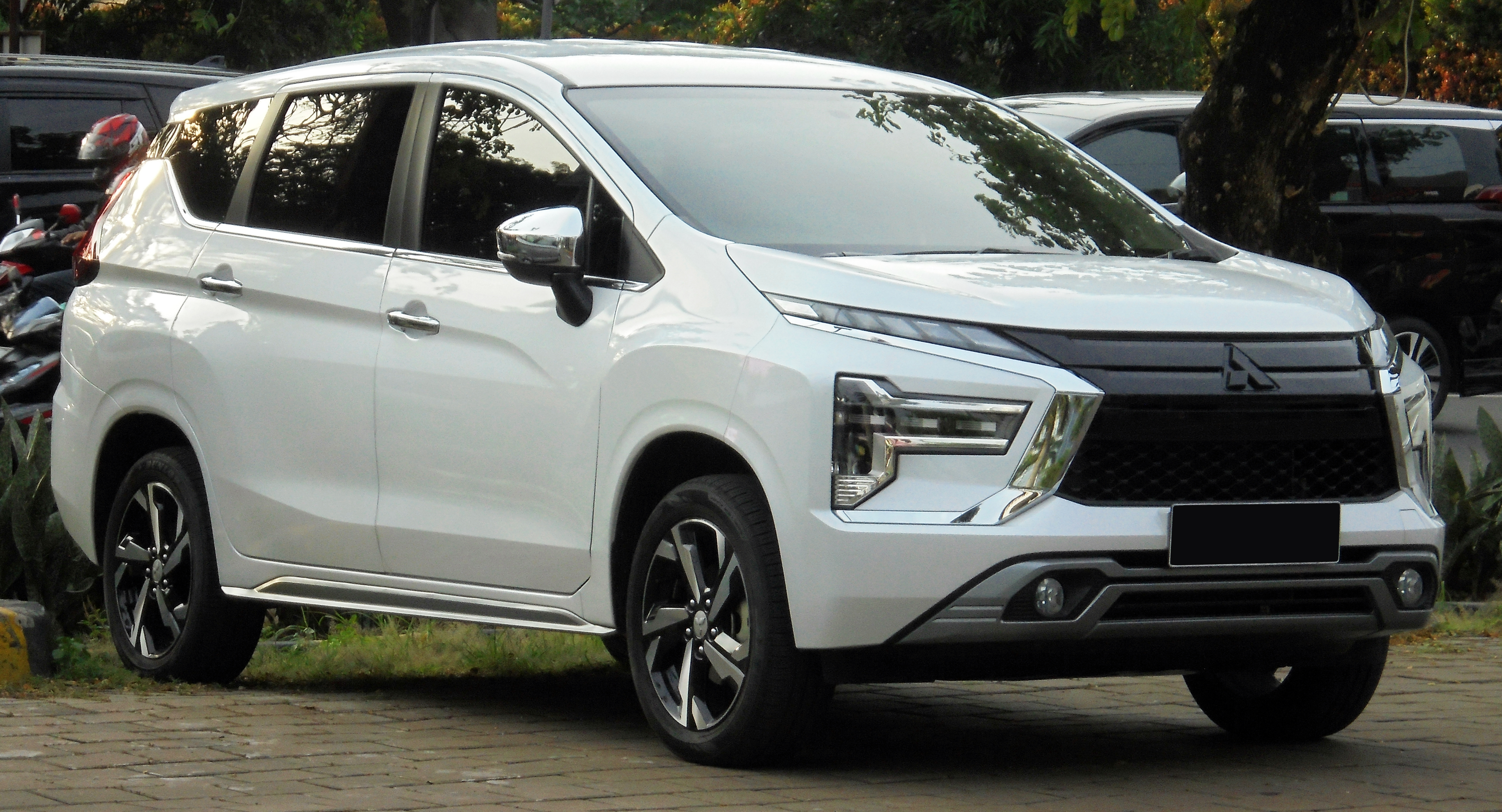
2022 Xpander Ultimate (Indonesia)

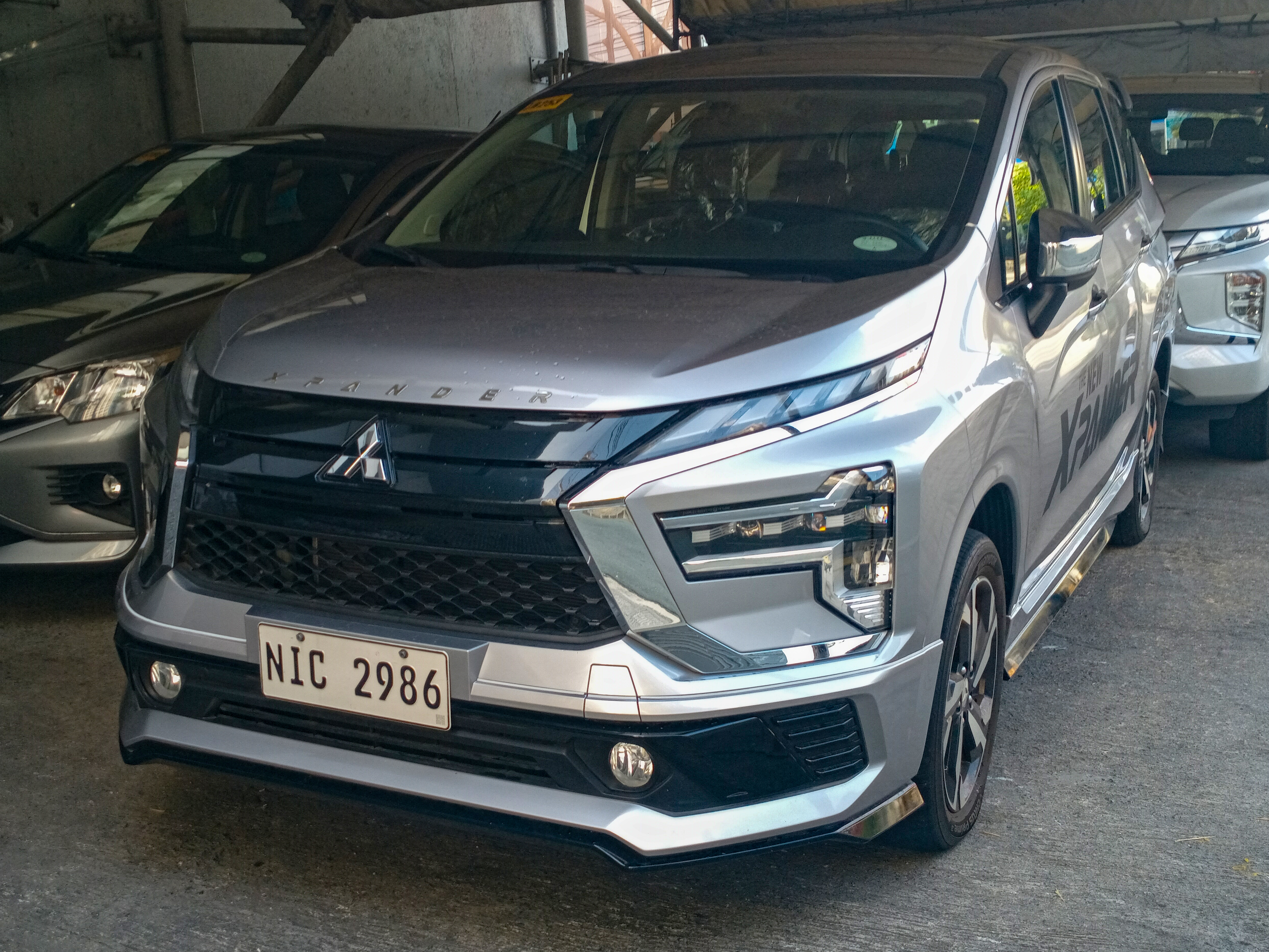
2022 Xpander GLS with optional aero kits (Philippines)

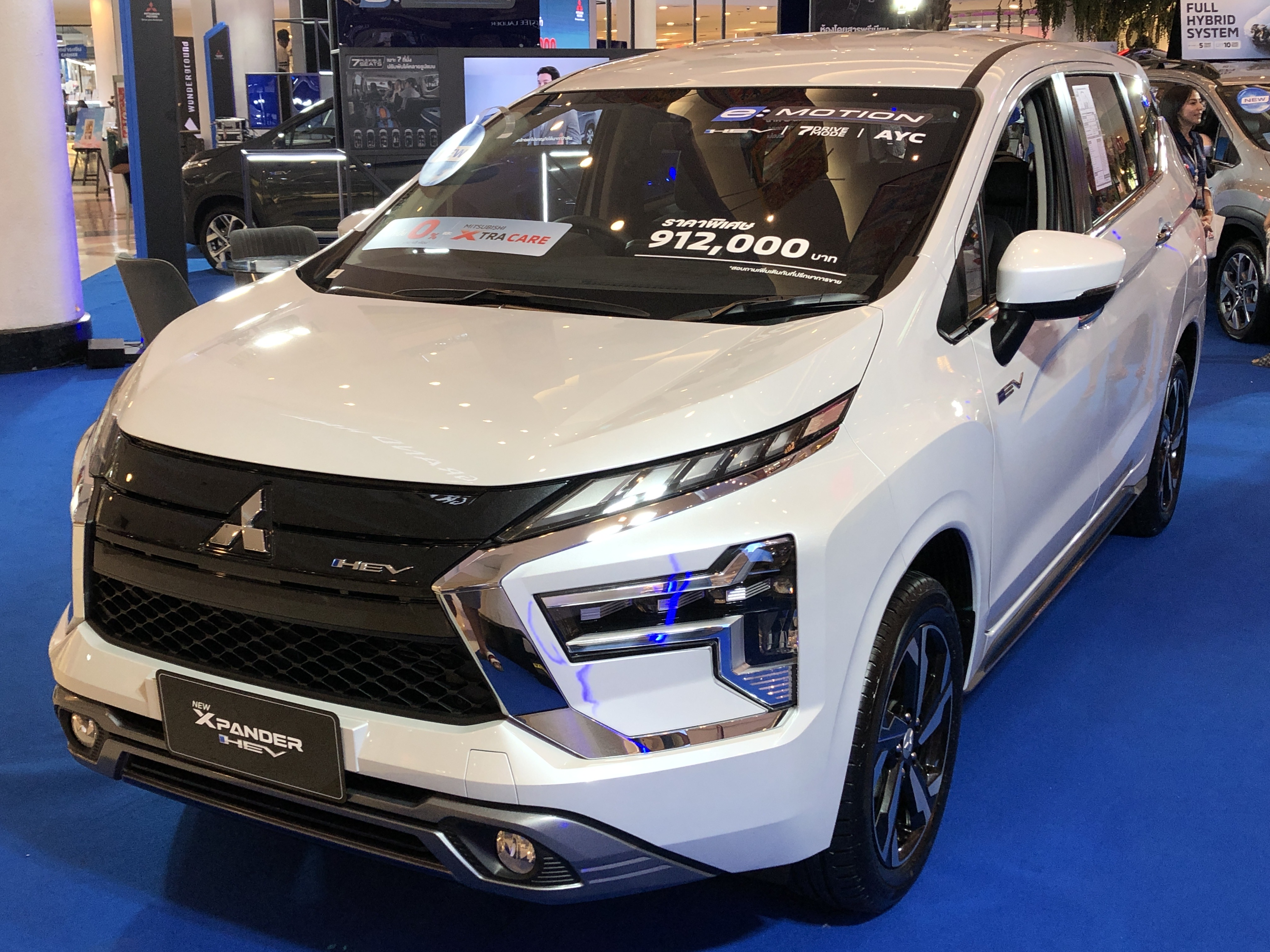
2024 Xpander HEV (Thailand)

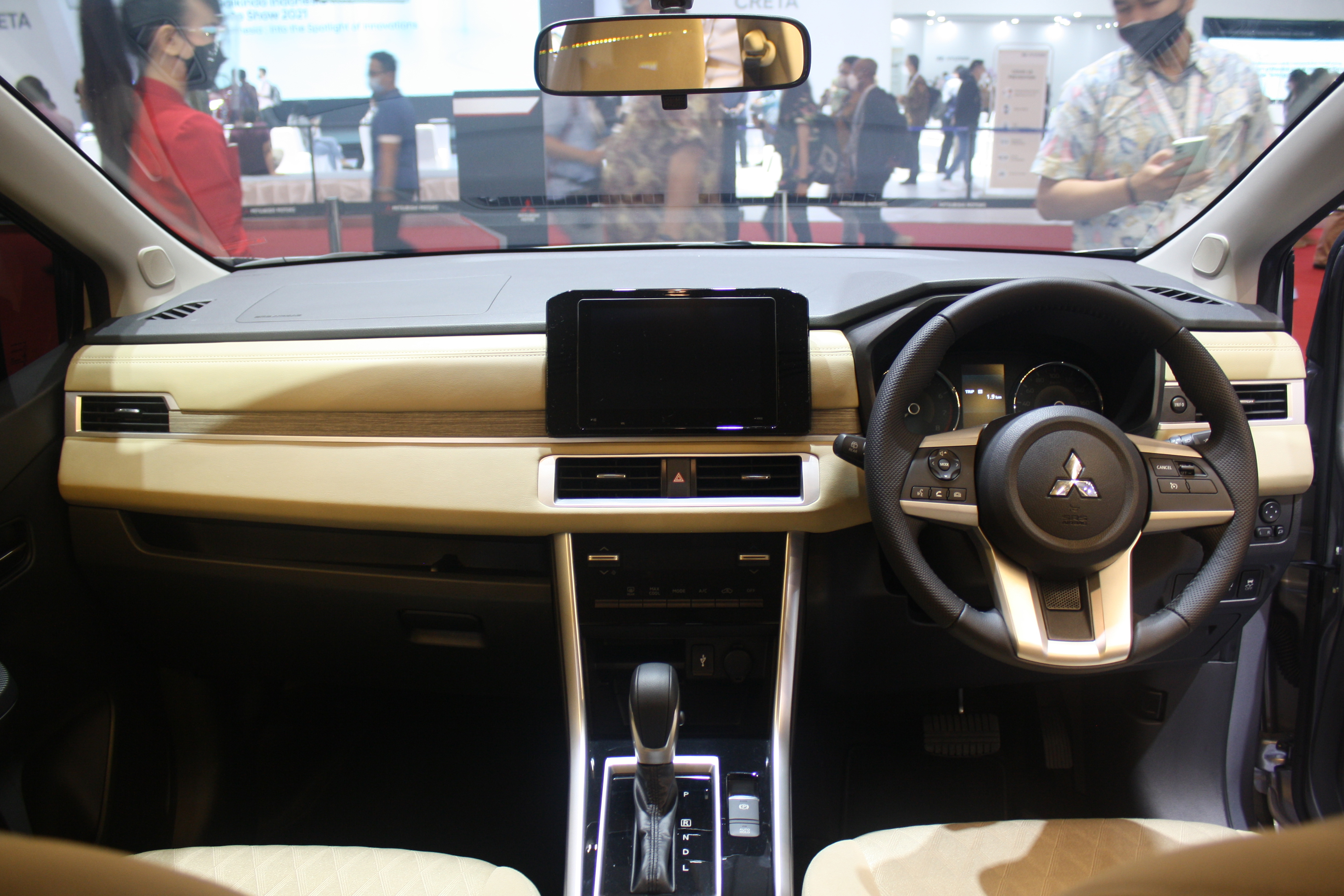
2021 Xpander Ultimate interior (Indonesia)

=== Second facelift ===
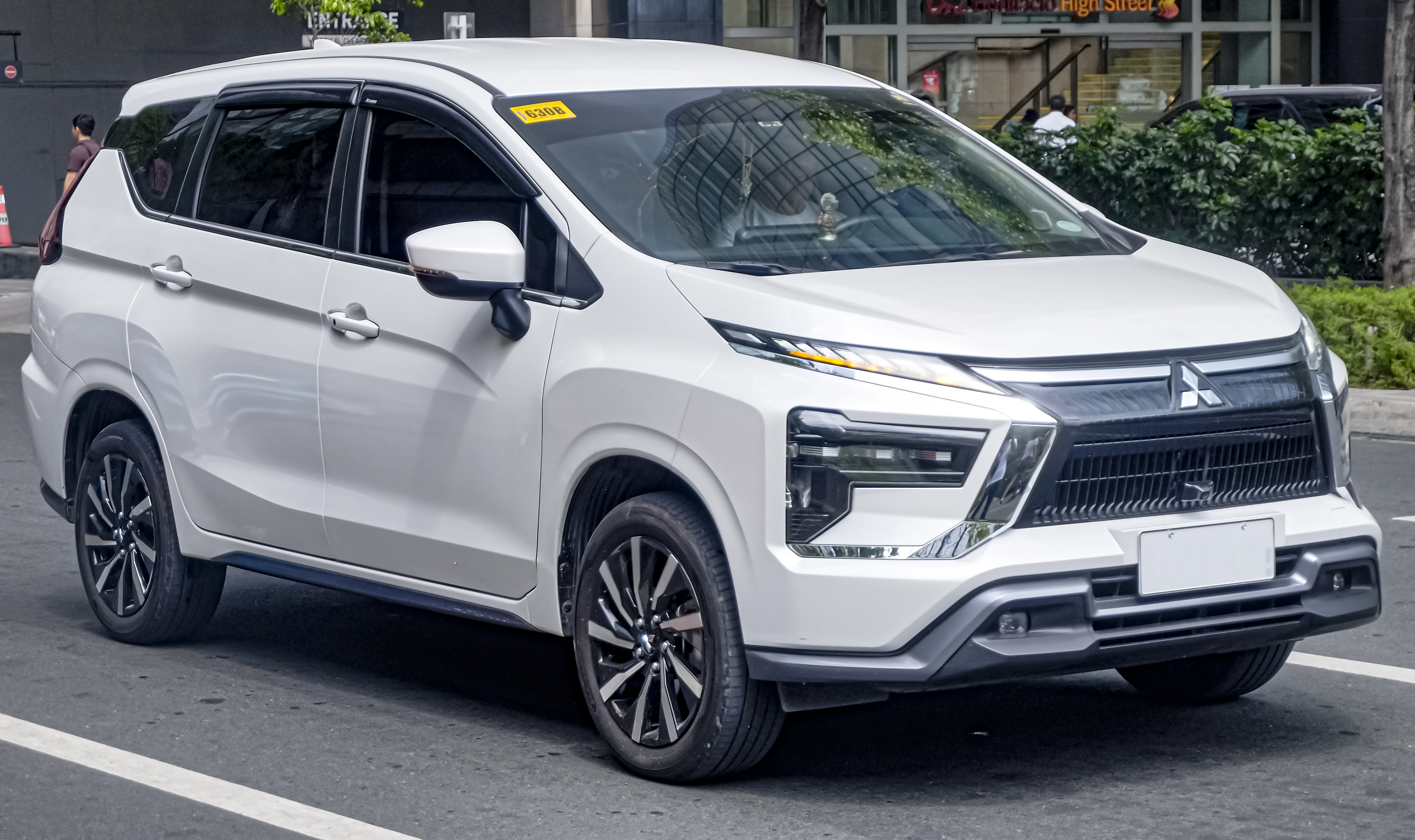
2025 Xpander GLS (Philippines)

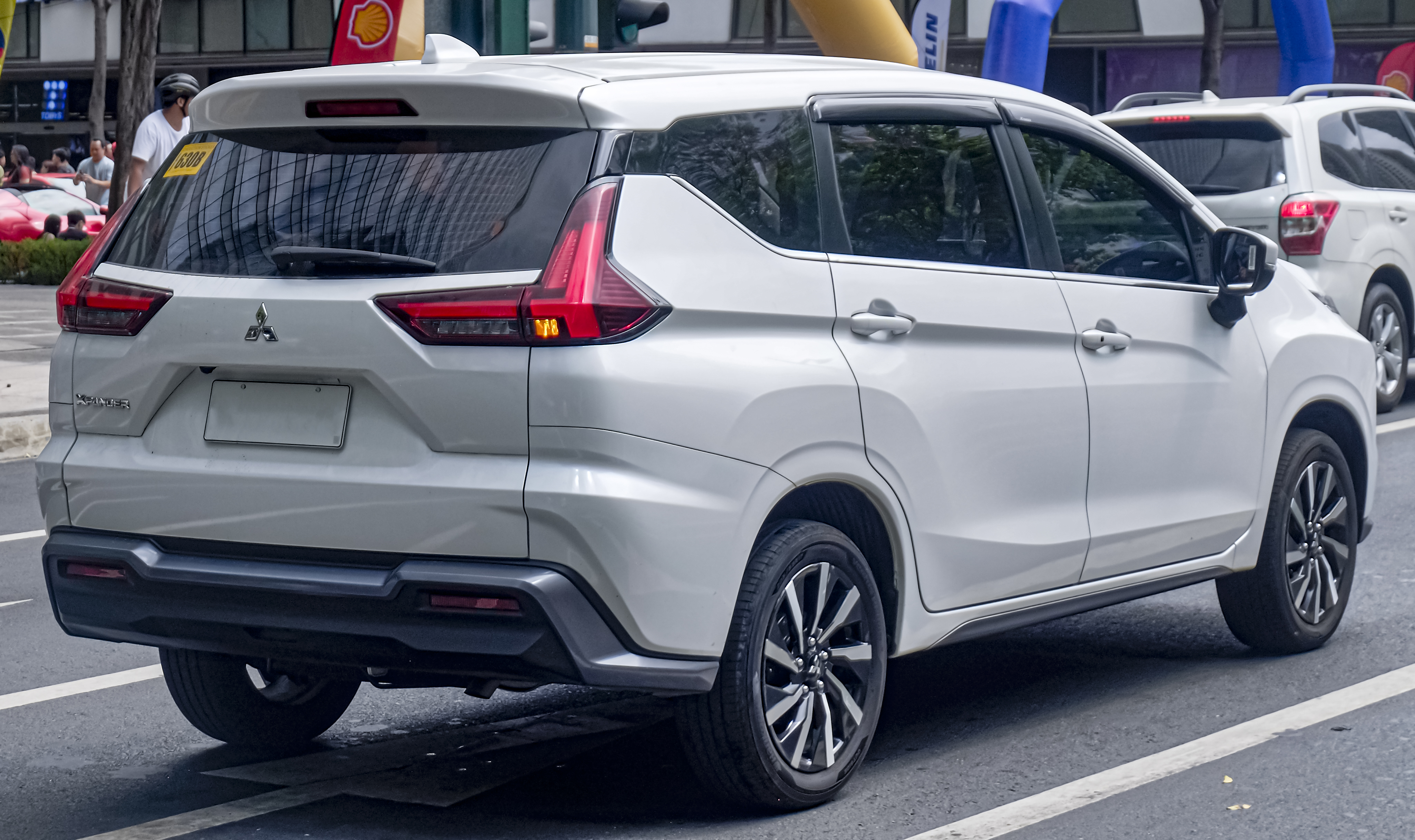
2025 Xpander GLS (Philippines)

== Xpander Cross ==
The Xpander Cross is a more rugged-looking variant of the standard Xpander. It was first introduced in Indonesia on 12 November 2019. The Xpander Cross for the Indonesian market is based on the Xpander Ultimate trim and comes with redesigned grille, restyled front and rear bumpers, addition of black over fenders, side body garnish, roof rails, LED headlights and fog lights, black tailgate garnish, shark fin antenna, 17-inch two-tone alloy wheels, revised suspension system with higher ground clearance at 225 mm (8.9 in), rear window defogger, and black and brown interior with silver panels. It is available with either manual or automatic transmission. The Premium Package is equipped with leather seats, hood emblem and the V-Kool window film is also offered as an option for the Xpander Cross with automatic transmission.

The Xpander Cross Rockford Fosgate Black Edition variant based on the Premium Package trim was launched in Indonesia on 20 October 2020. It was equipped with an improved audio system from Rockford Fosgate that also comes with a subwoofer and power amplifier from Rockford Fosgate. In addition, the variant also comes with black interior and exterior details such as on the roof rails, rims, front and back bumper underguards, and side mirrors. Only 500 units of the variant were produced. On 10 June 2021, the Rockford Fosgate Black Edition variant was reintroduced with an additional 360-degree camera feature.

The Xpander Cross received a black-coloured grille, updated dashboard design, digital air conditioning system, electronic parking brake, and CVT on 8 November 2021.

The Xpander Cross received its first facelift on 11 August 2022 at the 29th Gaikindo Indonesia International Auto Show. The changes consisted of redesigned front and rear fascias, headlights, and tail lights, similar to the regular Xpander. Interior changes included updated steering wheel and an 8-inch digital instrument cluster. Active Yaw Control is standard.

In the Philippines, the Xpander Cross was launched on 12 March 2020 as the replacement of Xpander GLS Sport marketed as an SUV. It was also launched in Thailand on 16 March 2020. The Xpander Cross was launched in Vietnam on 16 July 2020 alongside the updated Xpander, the model also launched in Brunei on 9 July 2021 (facelift received on 3 March 2023) and in Mexico on 19 July 2021. The facelift Xpander Cross was launched in the GCC countries in June 2023.

The Xpander Elite Limited Edition variant based on the premium trim was launched in Indonesia in May 2024. It was equipped with. an improved audio system. In addition, the variant also comes with two-tone colours and exterior details such as on the black-painted roof rails, black roof, and Elite Limited Edition emblem. Only 800 units of the variant were produced.

The Xpander Cross received its second facelift on 16 May 2025. The changes consisted of redesigned front and rear fascias, and new alloy wheel designs. Inside, there is a new larger 10-inch touchscreen head unit, new interior colour theme, a redesigned digital instrument cluster and steering wheel borrowed from the Xforce. For safety, the second facelift model of the Xpander Cross features six airbags and a central headrest for the second-row seats. The second facelift of the Xpander Cross has been launched in Brunei on 24 October 2025.

=== Pre-facelift ===
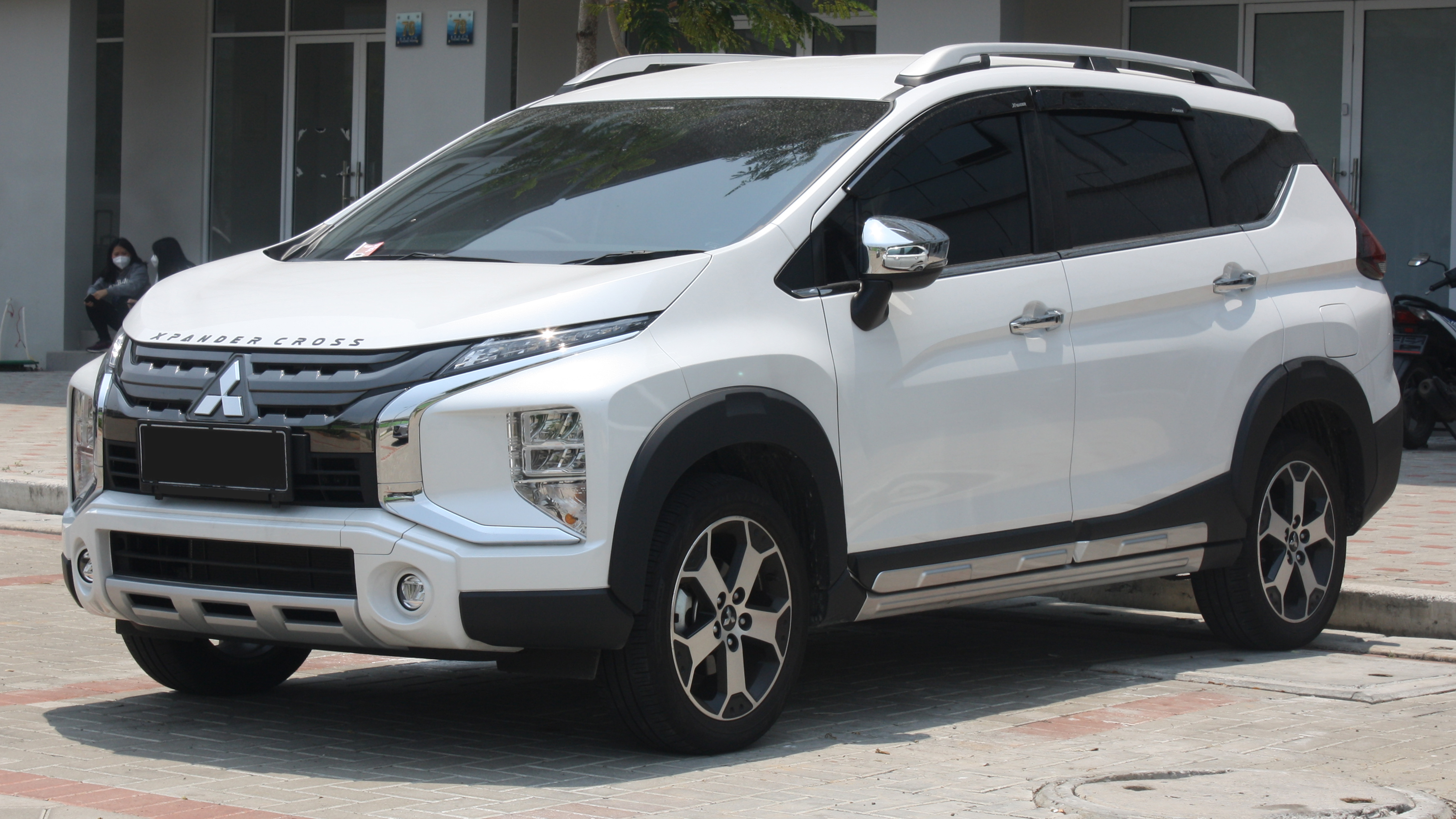
2021 Xpander Cross (Indonesia)

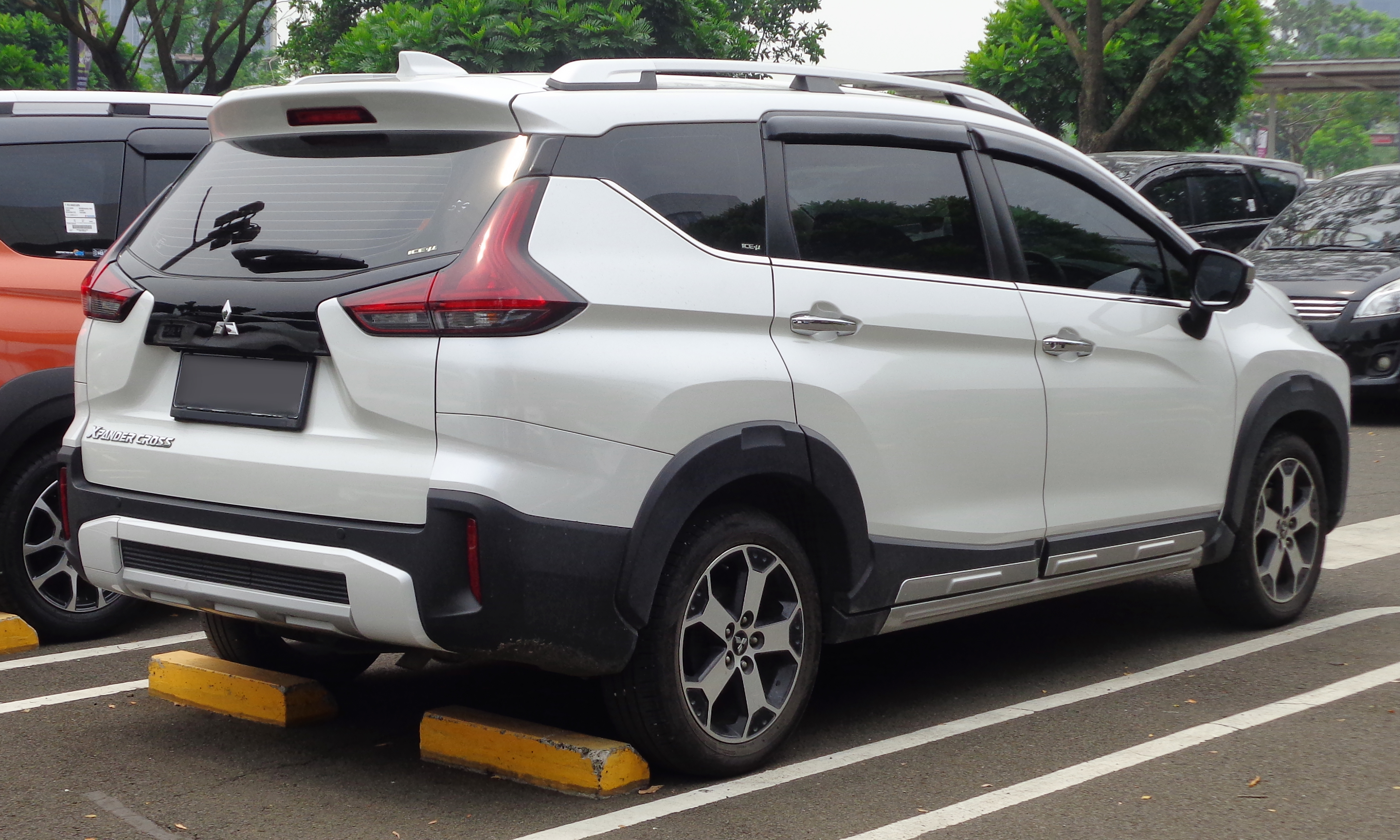
2020 Xpander Cross (Indonesia)

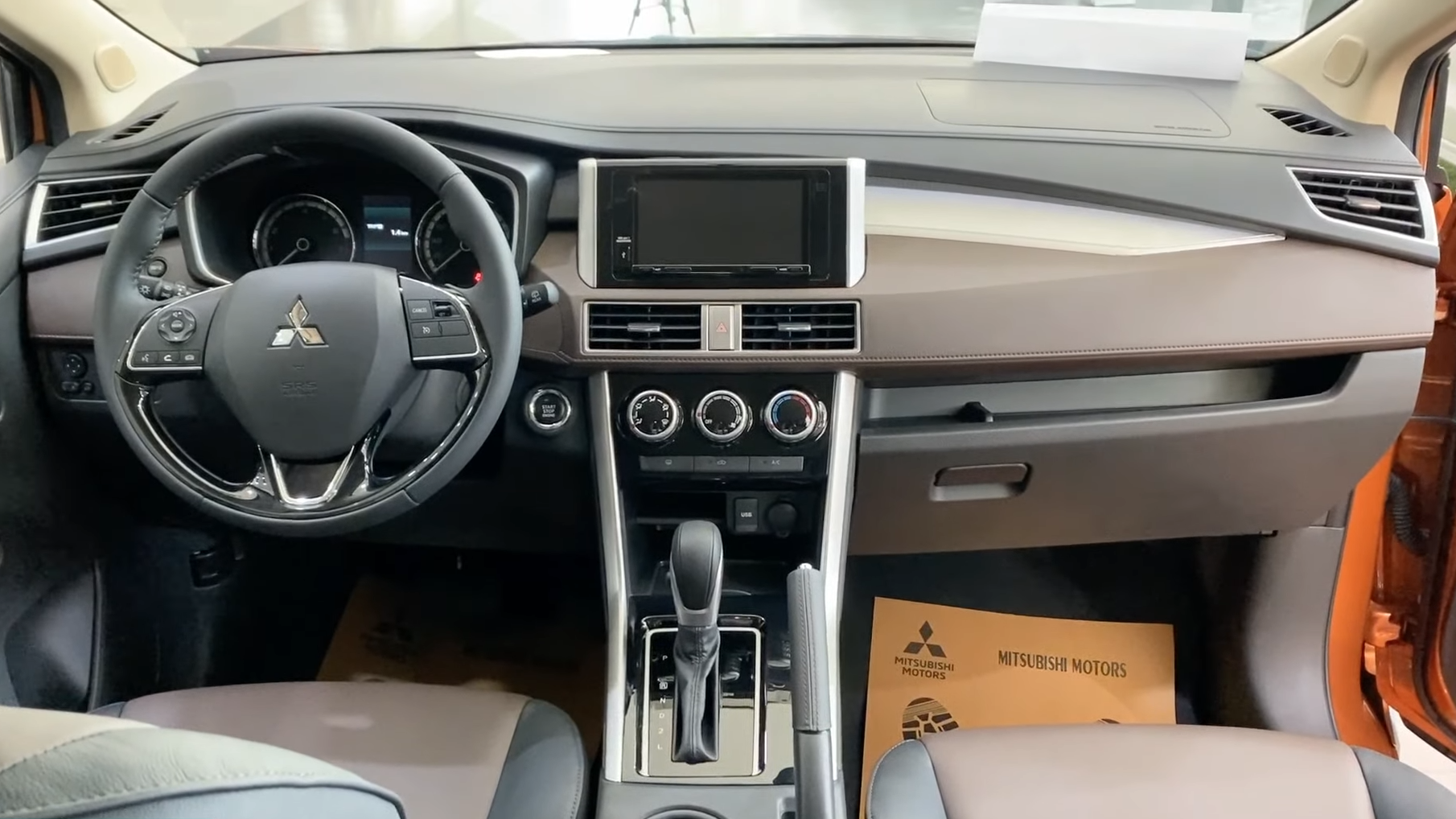
2020 Interior

=== First facelift ===
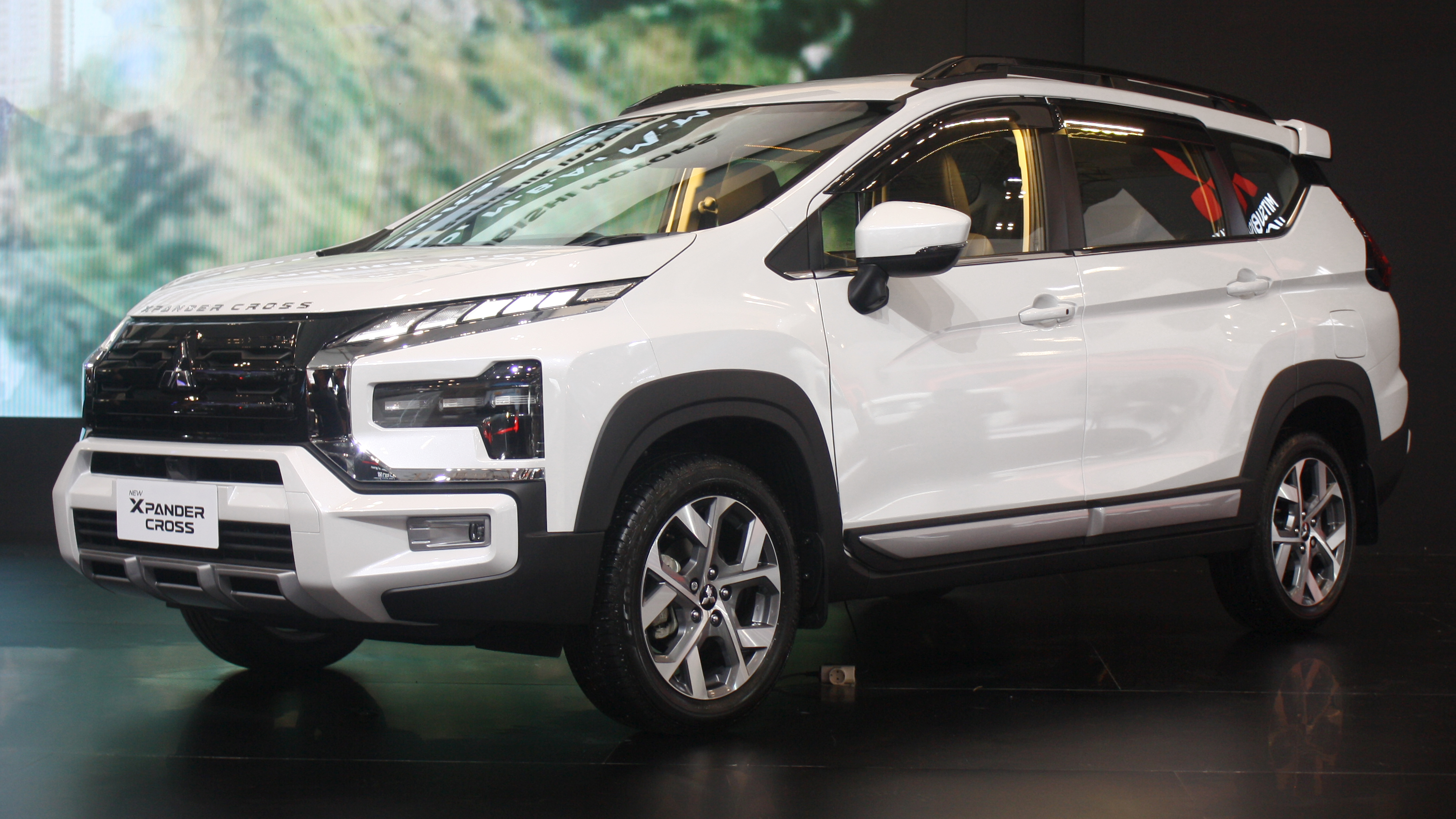
2022 Xpander Cross (Indonesia)

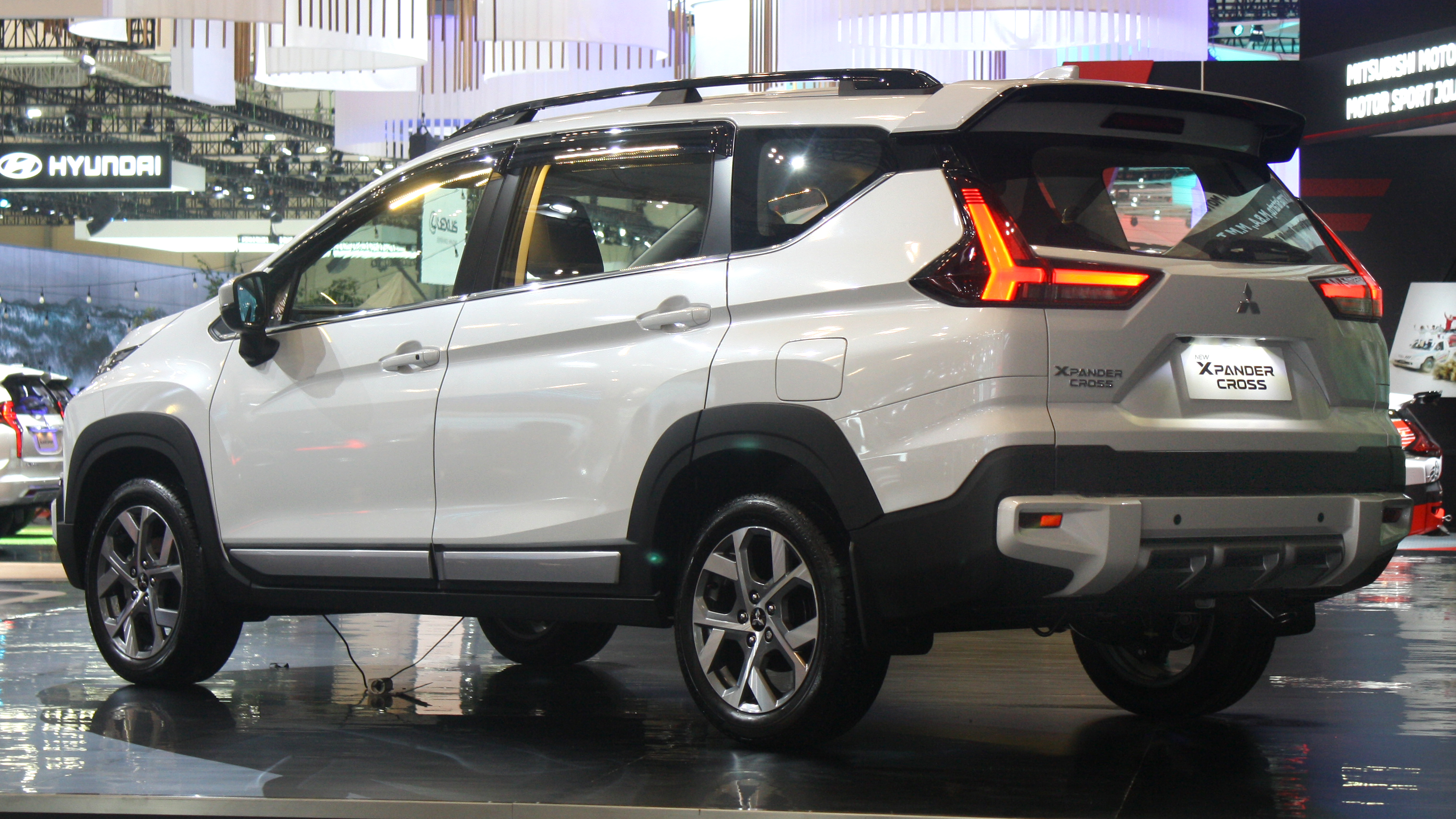
2022 Xpander Cross (Indonesia)

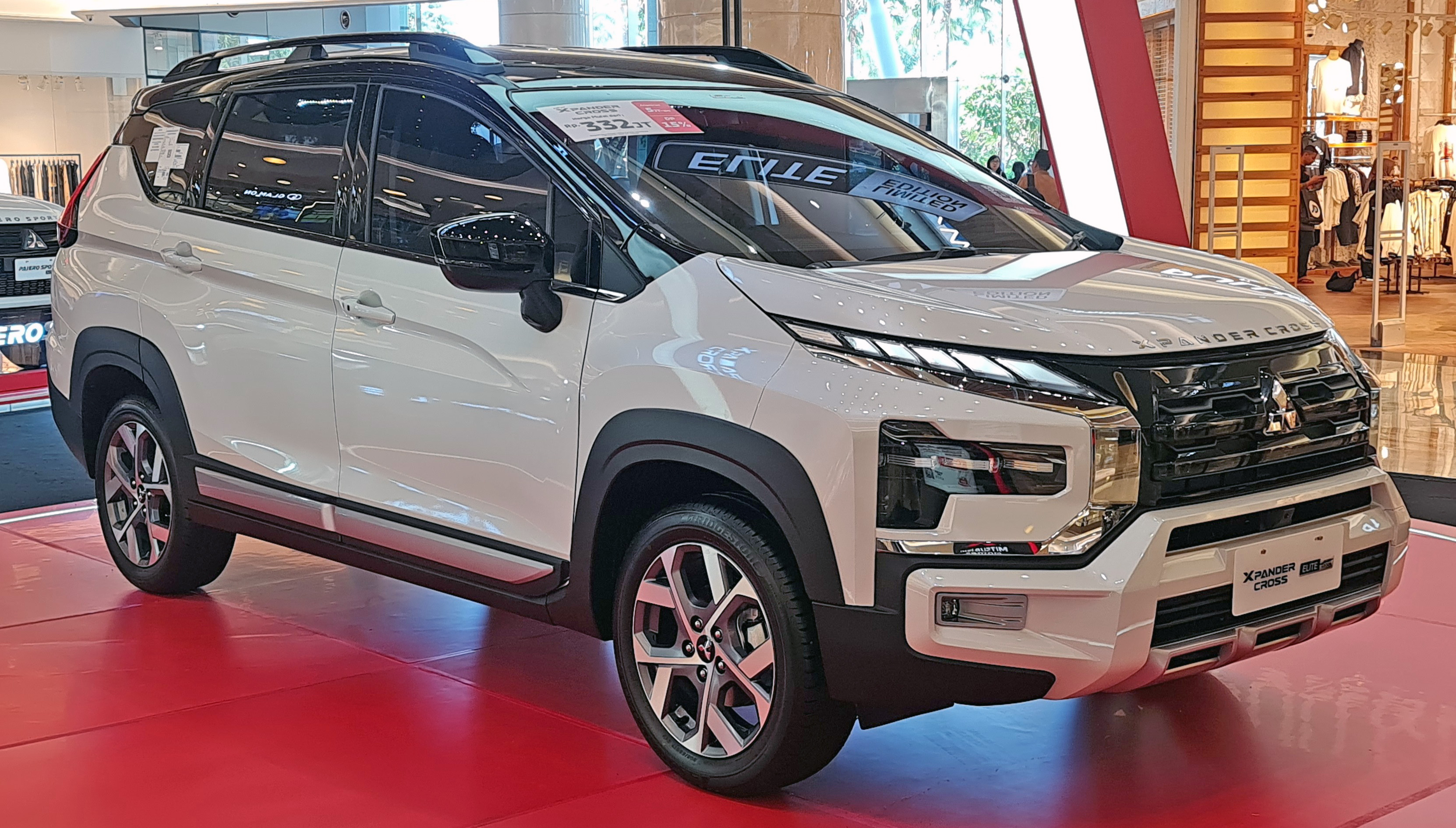
2024 Xpander Cross Elite Limited Edition (Indonesia)

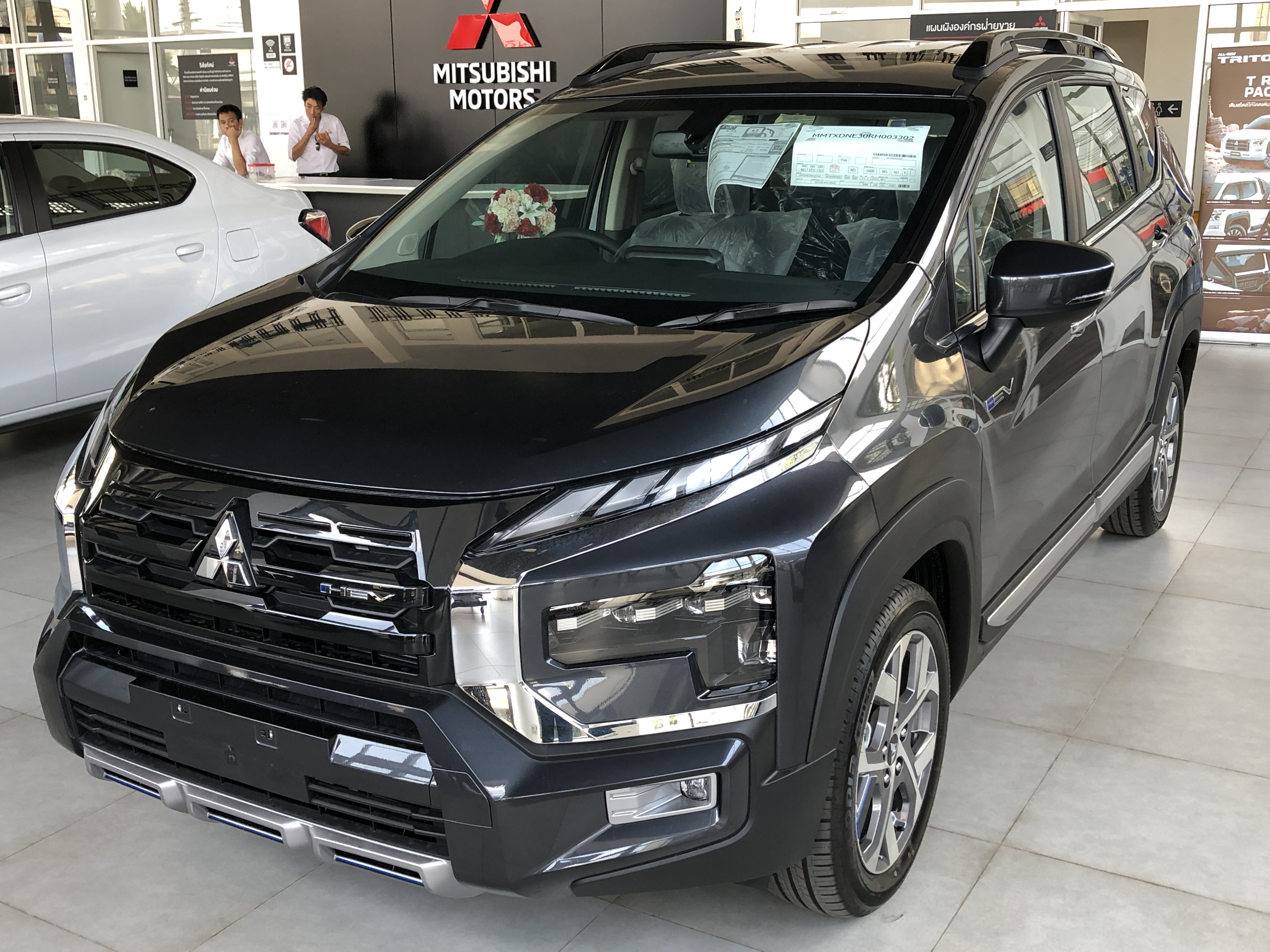
2024 Xpander Cross HEV (Thailand)

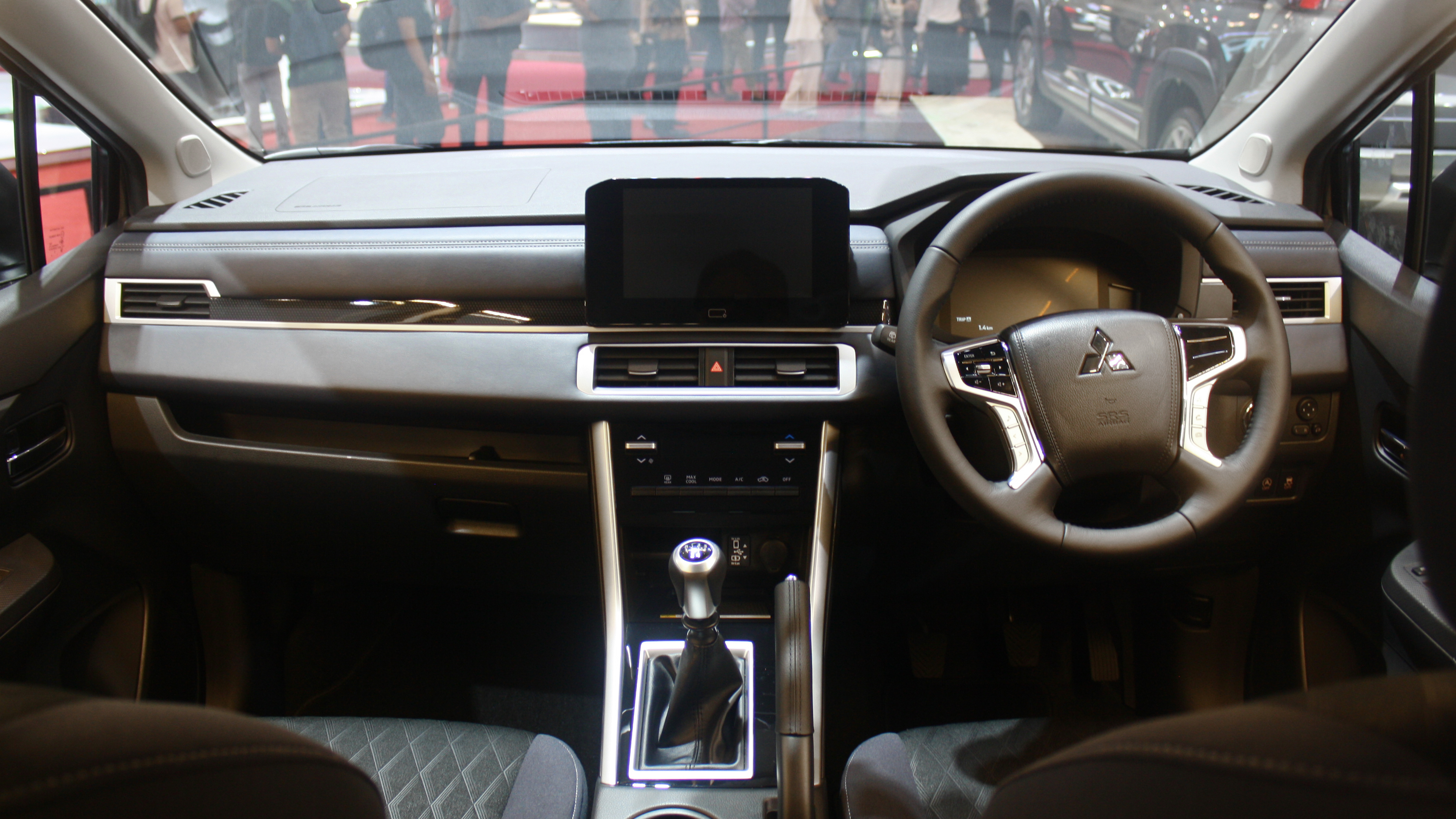
Interior

=== Second facelift ===
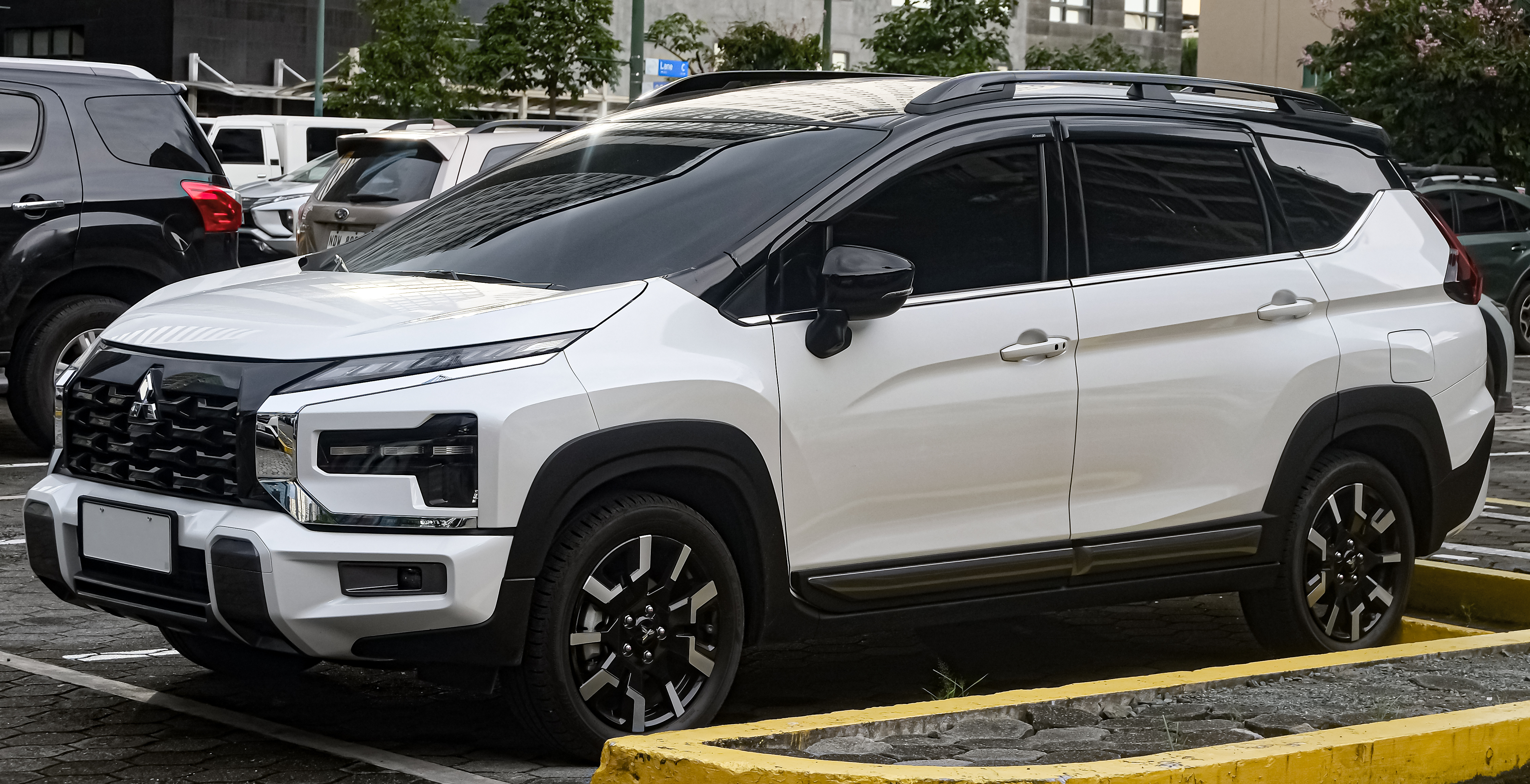
2025 Xpander Cross (Philippines)

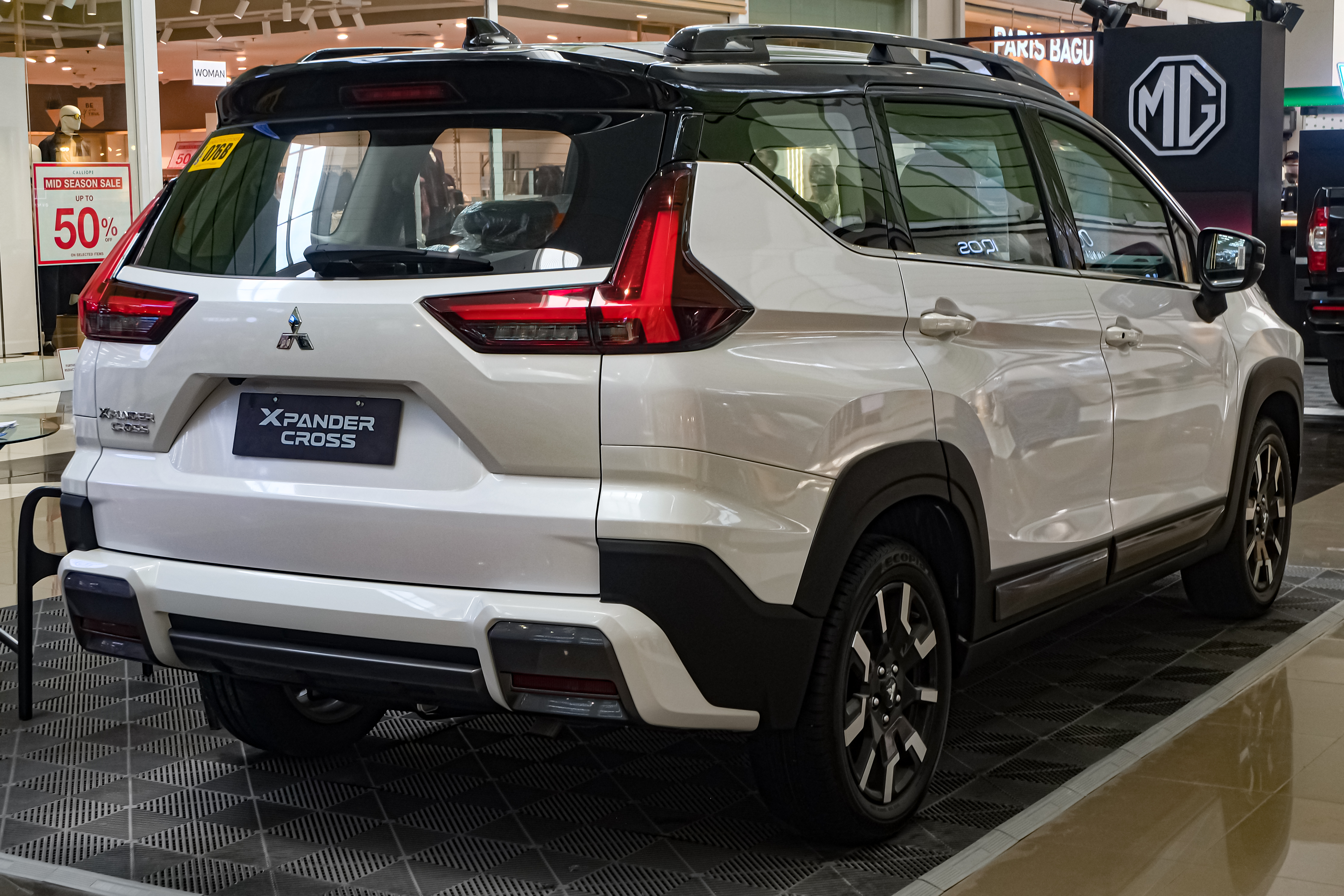
2025 Xpander Cross (Philippines)

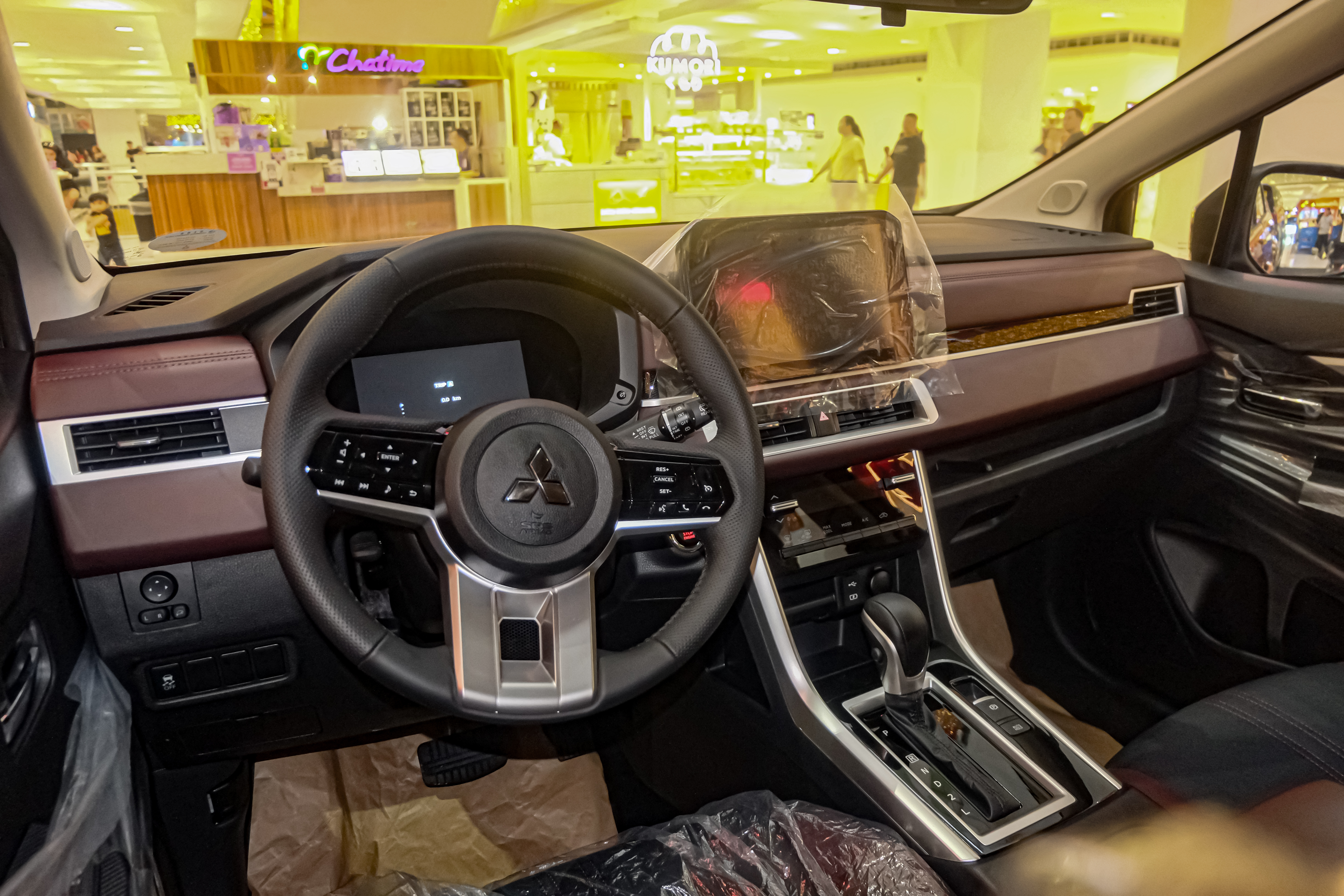
Interior

== Powertrain ==
The Xpander is powered by a 1.5-litre 4A91 petrol engine. Transmission options include a 5-speed manual and 4-speed automatic. Since the 2021 facelift, some markets such as Indonesia and Thailand switched to a CVT replacing the 4-speed automatic. Many markets such as the Philippines, Vietnam, Malaysia, and Mexico retains the older 4-speed automatic gearbox.

In February 2024, the Xpander HEV was introduced in Thailand. It adopts an in-house, newly developed hybrid electric system based on Mitsubishi Motors PHEV system, combining a 1.6-litre 4A92 Atkinson cycle engine with an electric motor, a lithium-ion battery with eCVT transaxle transmission. Rear disc brakes, an electric shifter, seven selectable driving modes and new suspension were also added.

Type	Engine code	Displ.	Power	Torque	Electric motor	Battery	Transmission	Model code	Layout	Cal. years
Petrol	4A91	1,499 cc (1.5 L) I4	77 kW (103 hp; 105 PS) @ 6,000 rpm	141 N⋅m (14.4 kg⋅m; 104 lb⋅ft) @ 4,000 rpm	-	-	5-speed manual	NC1W	FWD	2017–present
Petrol	4A91	1,499 cc (1.5 L) I4	77 kW (103 hp; 105 PS) @ 6,000 rpm	141 N⋅m (14.4 kg⋅m; 104 lb⋅ft) @ 4,000 rpm	-	-	4-speed automatic	NC1W	FWD	2017–present
Petrol	4A91	1,499 cc (1.5 L) I4	77 kW (103 hp; 105 PS) @ 6,000 rpm	141 N⋅m (14.4 kg⋅m; 104 lb⋅ft) @ 4,000 rpm	-	-	CVT	NC2W	FWD	2021–present
Petrol hybrid	4A92 (Atkinson cycle)	1,590 cc (1.6 L) I4	Engine: 70 kW (94 hp; 95 PS) @ 5,100 rpm Motor: 85 kW (114 hp; 116 PS)	Engine: 134 N⋅m (13.7 kg⋅m; 98.8 lb⋅ft) @ 4,500 rpm Motor: 255 N⋅m (26.0 kg⋅m; 188 lb⋅ft)	AC synchronous	1.1 kWh lithium-ion	eCVT	NE3W	FWD	2024–present

== Markets ==
=== Africa ===
==== South Africa ====
The Xpander was launched in South Africa on 17 June 2021. It is only offered in one trim with 5-speed manual and 4-speed automatic transmission options.

The Xpander Cross was launched in South Africa on 10 March 2025 in a sole variant.

=== Asia ===
==== Bangladesh ====
In Bangladesh, the Xpander is only available in one trim level: GLS.

==== Brunei ====
The Xpander was launched on 17 May 2019. The trim levels offered are GLX and GLS with 5-speed manual or 4-speed automatic transmissions. The first facelift Xpander for the Bruneian market was launched in November 2020 and leaving only the GLX (automatic model) as a single variant option.

The second facelift Xpander went on sale in November 2022.

==== Indonesia ====
In Indonesia, the Xpander was initially available in five trim levels: GLX, GLS, Exceed, Sport and Ultimate. The manual transmission was initially offered in GLX, GLS and Exceed trims, while the automatic unit was initially offered in Exceed, Sport and Ultimate trims. The GLS trim with automatic transmission and Sport trim with the manual unit was added later in August 2018. The Limited Edition variant based on the Ultimate trim with aero kits was made available in April 2019 to commemorate the sale of the Xpander which had reached 100,000 units. Only 1,000 units were made.

The Xpander received a minor update on 21 February 2020 with a redesigned grille and LED headlights. The Exceed, Sport and Ultimate trims received redesigned 16-inch two-tone alloy wheels and some equipment was changed, while the GLX trim was discontinued.

On 20 October 2020, the Black Edition variant based on the Exceed trim was made available limited to 1,000 units.

The Rockford Fosgate Black Edition variant based on the Sport trim was made available on 10 June 2021, which added the Rockford Fosgate subwoofer.

The Xpander received its first facelift on 8 November 2021. The changes includes redesigned front and rear fascias, headlights, tail lights, dashboard, and steering wheel design. The latter two were only applied to Sport and Ultimate trims. The 4-speed automatic transmission is replaced by a CVT unit and the electronic parking brake is also adopted on Sport (CVT only) and Ultimate trims. Some other updates include increased wheel size (up to 17 inches), digital air conditioning system on Sport and Ultimate trims, adoption of an idling start-stop system (removed in 2022), the installation of an external exhaust gas recirculation system for the 4A91 engine, improved chassis rigidity, and retuned suspension systems. The Sport trim was discontinued in 2024, manual transmission and black interior option was later added to the Ultimate trim in May 2024.

The Xpander received its second facelift on 16 May 2025 along with the Xpander Cross. The changes includes redesigned front and rear fascias with a new chrome accent on the grille, and new alloy wheel designs. Inside, most changes for the second facelift model are found on the Ultimate trim with a new larger 10-inch touchscreen head unit, new interior colour theme, a redesigned digital instrument cluster and steering wheel borrowed from the Xforce. For safety, the second facelift model features six airbags and an Active Yaw Control on the Ultimate trim, and a central headrest for the second-row seats. A new Exceed Tourer trim replaced the Exceed trim.

==== Malaysia ====
The Xpander was launched in Malaysia on 20 November 2020. It is locally assembled at the DRB-HICOM facility in Pekan, Pahang and is only offered in a sole variant.

The facelifted Xpander was launched in Malaysia on 19 September 2024 with two variants available. The 4-speed automatic transmission was retained from the pre-facelift model.

==== Middle East ====
The Xpander was launched in GCC countries in March 2021. It is available in two trim levels GLX and GLS with 4-speed automatic transmission.

The facelifted Xpander was launched in June 2022.

==== Myanmar ====
In Myanmar, the Xpander is available in one trim level: GLS. It has been sold since September 2019.

==== Philippines ====
The Xpander made its debut in the Philippines on 1 March 2018, during the Xpander XPO event from 2 to 4 March 2018, and went on sale in May 2018 as the replacement for the Adventure, as well as the first Mitsubishi Motors product under the three-year "Drive for Growth" mid-term business plan. As an imported model, it was initially available in four trim levels: GLX, GLX Plus, GLS and GLS Sport.

The updated Xpander was launched in March 2020 alongside the Xpander Cross, which replaced the GLS Sport trim, making the regular Xpander available in three trim levels.

The Xpander Black Series was unveiled on 4 November 2021, replacing chrome trim in favor of matte black trim on the front and rear fascias, body panels, and door panels.

The first facelift Xpander was unveiled on 5 March 2022 and officially launched on 19 May 2022. For the Philippine market, the facelifted Xpander retained the 4-speed automatic transmission. The GLX Plus variant was removed from the lineup and was replaced by the automatic variant of the GLX.

The second facelift Xpander was released on 29 August 2025, along with the updated Xpander Cross.

==== Thailand ====
The Xpander was introduced in Thailand in August 2018 and is available in two trim levels: GLS Limited and GT.

The facelifted Xpander was released on 22 March 2022. For the Thai market, the facelifted Xpander replaced the 4-speed automatic transmission with the CVT.

The HEV models of the Xpander and Xpander Cross were introduced in Thailand in February 2024. In March 2025, limited edition PLAY variants of the Xpander HEV models were made available.

The second facelifted Xpander was launched in Thailand on 25 November 2025, with the same variants from the first facelift models.

==== Vietnam ====
The Xpander was launched in Vietnam on 8 August 2018, initially available in two trim levels: Standard (paired with a 5-speed manual transmission) and Eco (paired with a 4-speed automatic transmission). It became the country's best-selling MPV in the same year, surpassing the Toyota Innova.

The updated Xpander was launched in Vietnam on 3 June 2020, it retains the pre-update lineup alongside the Xpander Cross. Due to the high demand of Xpander in the country, Mitsubishi Motors Vietnam started production for the Xpander locally in its assembly plant in Bình Dương province on 20 July 2020.

The facelifted Xpander was launched in Vietnam on 13 June 2022, which added the flagship Premium trim. It retained the 4-speed automatic transmission from the previous models.

The second facelifted Xpander was launched in Vietnam on 22 September 2025, with two variants: Premium and Cross. In March 2026, a new manual variant was added to the line-up as the entry-level variant below the Premium variant.

=== Latin America ===
==== Mexico ====
The Xpander was introduced in the Mexican market on 19 July 2021. It is offered in one trim level alongside the Xpander Cross. The Mexican-market Xpander received a facelift in October 2023 for the 2024 model year.

== Reception ==
The car was well received at the 2017 Gaikindo Indonesia International Auto Show, as Mitsubishi Motors received 11,827 bookings for the Xpander during the event.

The Xpander has received mixed reviews from critics and journalists from its overseas export markets. Anton Andres of the Manila-based AutoIndustriya.com rated the car 8 out of 10, noting that the car is "comfortable, fuel-efficient, easy to drive (and park), and hugely practical" and "is relatively well equipped and the entire car is well thought out and put together". However, Andres gave a note about its steep price and the following price bumps, but he claimed that it is the best small MPV available if price is taken out of the equation. Richard Leu of Bangkok Post gave a score of 6 out of 10, claimed that "the engine is unremarkable as it lacks power and mated to an antiquated 4-speed automatic", and commented that the Xpander is "solely about usability and not driving ability". Bangkok Post also noted that the Xpander is unable to undercut the 150 g/km level of CO_{2} emissions and to meet E85-compatibility, making it liable to an excise tax of 30% in Thailand.

Some Indonesian automotive industry experts commented that the Xpander had "created a new trend" in the Indonesian small MPV class, which is the largest car segment in that market, particularly with its crossover SUV-inspired design and thus popularity. They commented, "Mitsubishi took the risk, but it worked successfully nonetheless".

== Motorsport ==
The Xpander AP4 is a rally car that competed in the Asia-Pacific Rally Championship in the AP4 class. It was first shown as the prototype at the 27th Indonesia International Motor Show through April to May 2019.

The exterior has been modified to meet FIA AP4 rally standards. The interior has been stripped down and the roll cage has been added. The air conditioning and other unnecessary features have also been removed. The race-ready version of the car was shown at the 27th Gaikindo Indonesia International Auto Show in July 2019. It was powered by a sleeved and de-stroked 2.0 L 4B11 engine to the displacement of 1.6 L and produced 261 kW (350 hp; 355 PS) and 556 N⋅m (410 lb⋅ft) of torque with the power transferred to the sequential manual transmission and four-wheel drive.

The car would originally make its official rally debut at the NZRC Goldrush Rally of Coromandel in Moewai Park, Whitianga, New Zealand from 16 to 17 August 2019 and piloted by Rifat Sungkar of Xpander Rally Team with Muhammad Redwan as the co-driver, but the FIA homologation process had not been finished at the time. The team then would use a Lancer Evolution VI spare car to be still able to compete in the rally. The Xpander AP4 has a claimed development cost of more than Rp 4,000,000,000 (approximately £230,000 as of July 2019).

On 11 July 2020, the car was finally tested for first time at Tembong Jaya circuit. The Xpander AP4 made its racing debut at Meikarta Sprint Rally 2020 driven by Rifat Sungkar and Muhammad Redwan.

The Xpander AP4 made its international debut at Shannons Adelaide Rally 2025 in Adelaide, Australia. According to Rifat, the basis for the Xpander type used is GLS grade.

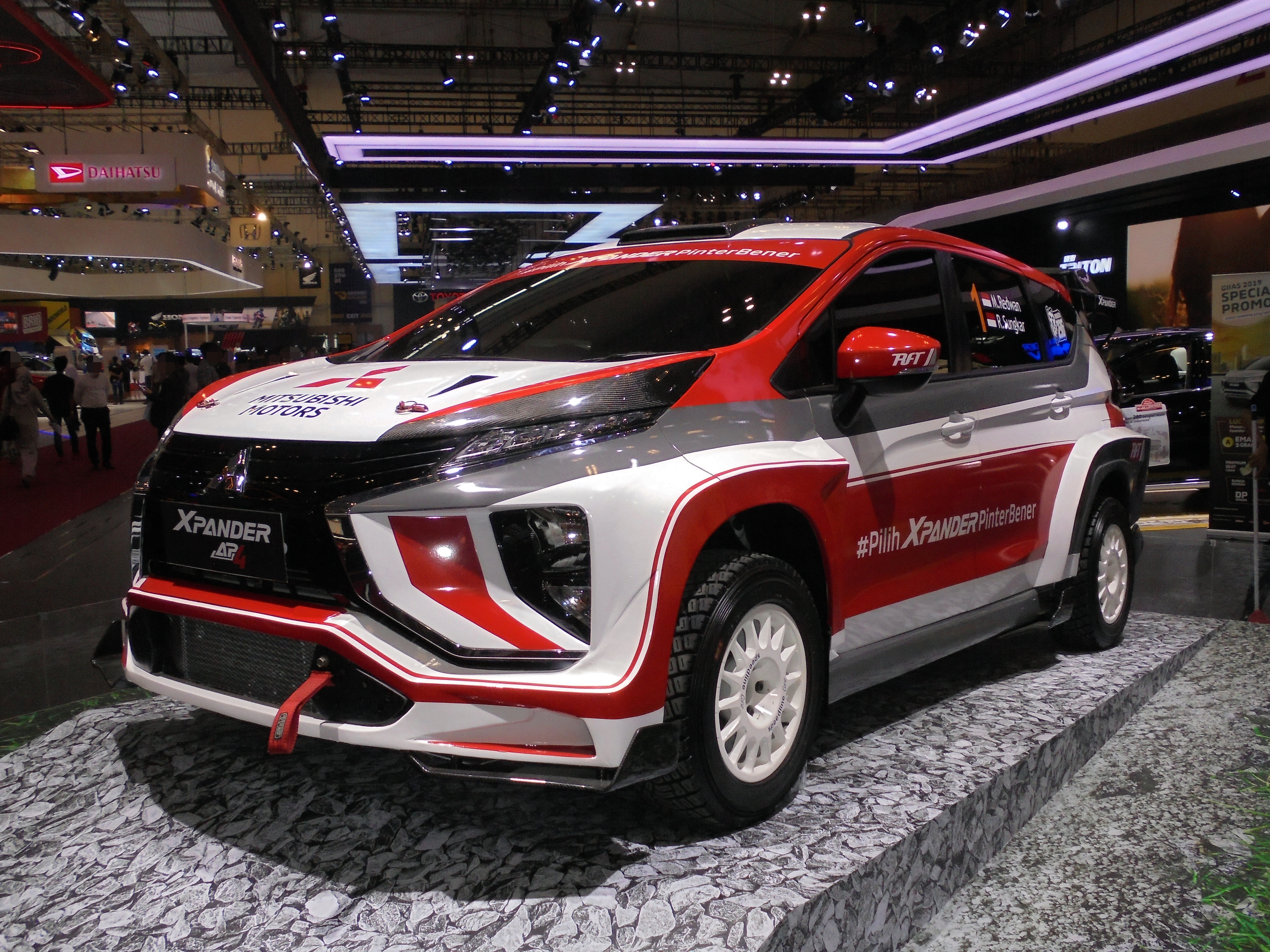
Xpander AP4

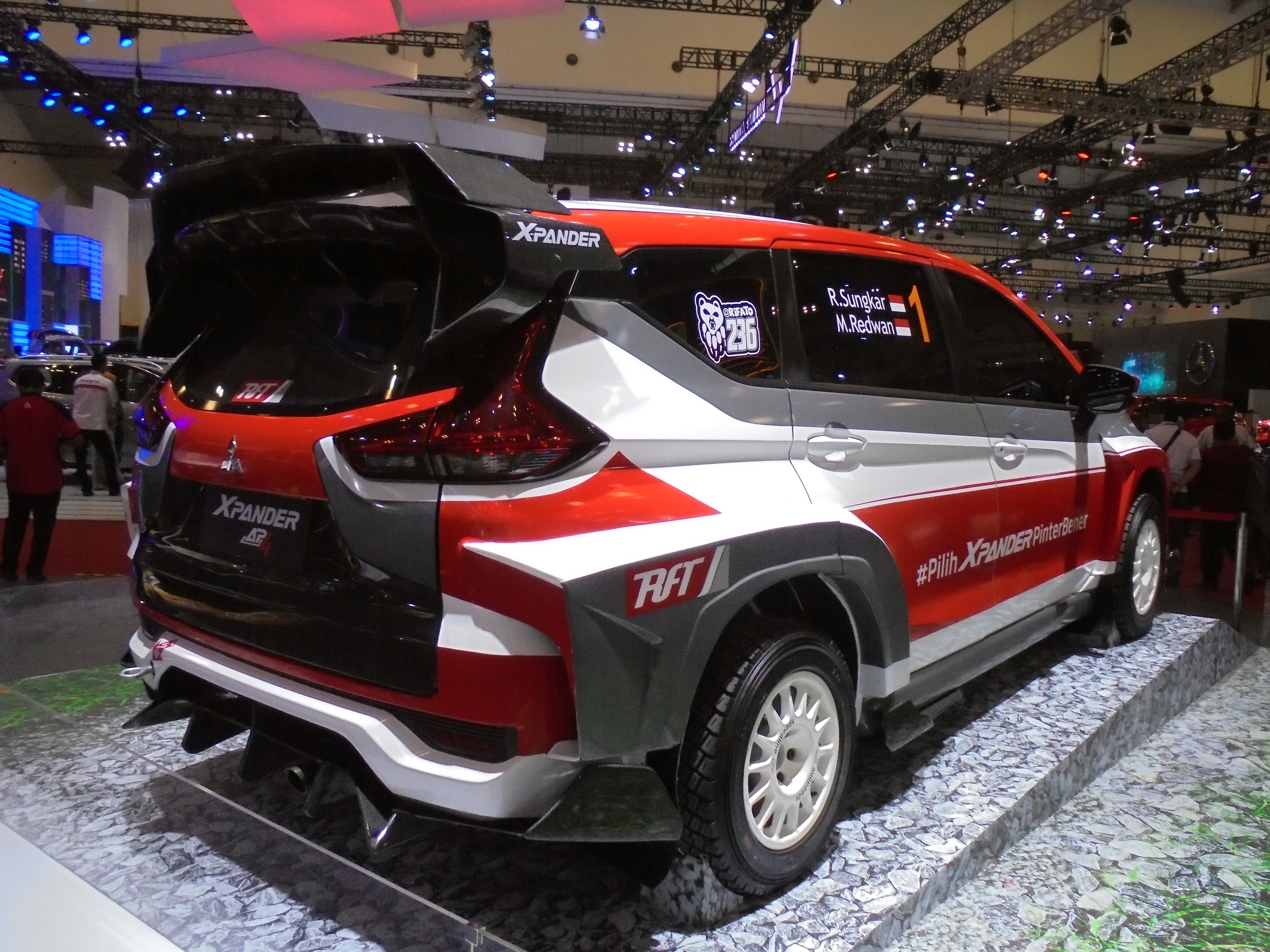
Xpander AP4

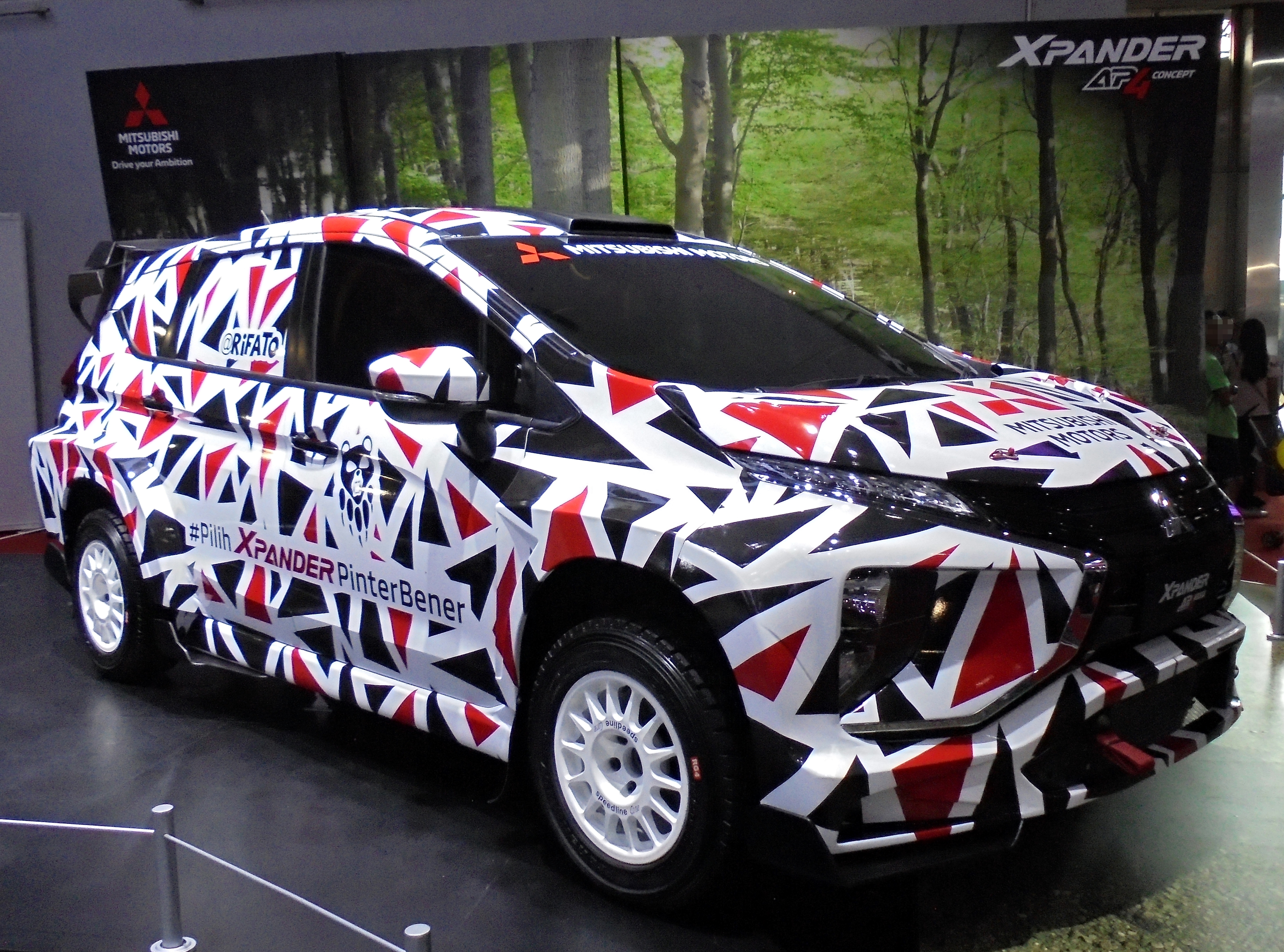
Xpander AP4 Concept

== Safety ==
Initially, the Xpander is only available with two airbags, with no option to increase the airbag count. Hoffen Teh, Senior Vice President of Mitsubishi Motors Malaysia, stated in 2020 that there was no significant market demand in ASEAN for more than two airbags, and therefore the Xpander was specifically designed to accommodate only two airbags. However, as of May 2025, this statement has become outdated, as Mitsubishi has released the second facelift of the Xpander and Xpander Cross, which are now available with six airbags.

ASEAN NCAP test results Mitsubishi Xpander (2018)
Test	Points
Overall:	4 /5 stars
Adult occupant:	39.08
Child occupant:	18.69
Safety assist:	13.19
Motorcyclist Safety:	NA

== Annual production ==
FY	Production
FY	Indonesia (MMKI)
2017	35,727
2018	122,348

(Sources: Facts & Figures 2018, Facts & Figures 2019, Mitsubishi Motors website)

== Sales ==
As of September 2018, more than 100,000 units of the car has been sold. In that year, the Xpander became the second best-selling passenger car in Indonesia, behind the Toyota Avanza. In 2019, the Xpander was the most exported car in Indonesia, with 64,714 units exported overseas.

Year	Indonesia		Philippines	Thailand	Vietnam	Malaysia (Note: Figures based on registration (Malaysia))	South Africa	Mexico
Year	Xpander	Xpander Cross	Philippines	Thailand	Vietnam	Malaysia	South Africa	Mexico
2017	11,890							
2018	75,075		13,502	5,509				
2019	59,879	2,787	19,089	16,196	20,098			
2020	14,793	11,569	10,443	11,974	16,844	921		
2021	30,283	24,341	11,342	8,925	13,616	7,397	461	2,151
2022	31,525	16,295	13,090	12,547	21,983	14,316	1,025	5,584
2023	21,251	18,104	22,509	9,074	19,740	11,906	721	3,837
2024	19,883	13,023	26,242	11,211	19,498	9,052		5,523
2025	16,267	8,761	28,081	5,260	19,891	9,102		5,497
