= Southern Districts =

Southern Districts may refer to:

- Southern Districts Cricket Club
- Southern Districts Football Club
- Southern Districts Gridiron Club
- Southern Districts Raiders
- Southern Districts Rugby Club
- Southern Districts women's cricket team

== See also ==
- Southern District (disambiguation)
