= Tatler Asia =

Hong-Kong based magazine publisher

Tatler

- Cover of the September 2023 issue of Tatler Hong Kong, Louise Wong by Oscar Chik
- Categories: Society
- Frequency: Monthly
- First issue: March 1977
- Company: Boya Mohindar, Lina Ross Mohindar (1977–2005); Edipresse (2005–present)
- Country: Hong Kong
- Based in: Southern District, Hong Kong
- Language: English
- Website: tatlergroup.com (corporate) tatlerasia.com (magazine)

Tatler Asia Ltd., also known as Tatler Group, is a Hong Kong media and entertainment company that publishes monthly society magazine Tatler, the magazine covers high society, style, dining, travel, design, lifestyle, and wellness. Under the control of Mahabir and Lina Ross Mohindar from 1977 until 2005, since 2005 the company is owned and operated by Edipresse. Since 2025 the position of editor-in-chief is vacant.

Based in the Wong Chuk Hang neighbourhood of Hong Kong, Tatler Hong Kong began publication in 1977 as the Hong Kong-edition of British society magazine Tatler. Presently there is no relationship between Tatler Asia and the Condé Nast-owned Tatler.

Tatler Singapore launched in 1982, as the first international edition. As of 2026, there are 12 international editions. Other editions of the magazine include Tatler Dining Guide, Tatler GMT, and Tatler Homes.

== Background ==
Tatler is a Hong Kong society magazine founded in 1977. The magazine is a monthly publication, published twelve times per year. Founded as the Hong Kong edition of Tatler and under the control of Boya and Lina Ross Mohindar from 1977 until 2005, since 2005 the magazine is owned by Edipresse.

=== Editors ===
Editor-in-Chief	Start year	End year
William Guy Alexander Wayte	1977	at least 1986
Jill Triptree	1990	1998
Sharie Ross-Tse	2001	2006
Sean Fitzpatrick	2007	2015
Claire Breen Melwani	2016	2016
Jakki Phillips	2017	2019
Kim Bui Kollar	2019	2019
Eric Wilson	2020	2022
Jacqueline Tsang	2022	2023
Ahy Choi	2023	2025

== History ==
Hong Kong Tatler was launched in March 1977 as the Hong Kong edition of the British magazine Tatler. The magazine was published in a partnership by William Guy Alexander Wayte (owner of British Tatler) and Mahabir "Boya" Mohindar and Lina Ross Mohindar. By the mid-1980s the Mohindars had taken total control of the publication and it was no longer associated with the British edition. According to the South China Morning Post after a lawsuit between Boya Mohindar and Condé Nast (publishers of Tatler from 1982 to present), they settled out of court and Mohindar was given the rights to the publication in Asia. At the time of the launch of Hong Kong Tatler the magazine focused on Hong Kong's mainly British high society and old money families from China. Lina Ross Mohindar said "We created a local high society with a mix of all nationalities."

Tatler Shanghai was launched in September 2002. The magazine was a joint-venture between Communications Management Ltd (publishing company of Hong Kong Tatler, owned by Boya Mohindar and Lina Ross Mohindar) and the Yifei Group.

The eight Asian Tatler publications had an artistic and editorial redesign in 2003.

In 2006 Boya and Lina Ross Mohindar sold Communications Management Ltd to the Swiss publishing group Edipresse for a sum of about US$100 to 120 million. Michel Lamunière (of the Lamunière family which own Edipresse) moved from Switzerland to Hong Kong in 2015 to run the Asian division.

In 2019 Edipresse Media Asia was rebranded as Tatler Asia Group. This year the head offices were also relocated to a building designed by COLLECTIVE in Wong Chuk Hang .

The magazine was rebranded in 2020 with a new logo, larger page count, and now aiming at a more modern and younger audience. This was done in attempts to shed the high society and "elite" image of the magazine. The annual revenue of Tatler Asia at the time was above $35 million. The artistic direction was refreshed again in 2023 and all magazine names changed from "location Tatler" to "Tatler location" for example Hong Kong Tatler became Tatler Hong Kong and Philippine Tatler became Tatler Philippines.

The relaunch of Tatler Thailand was announced in 2023.

A licencing agreement was signed with House of MOCO in 2024 for the launch of Tatler Vietnam. A licensing agreement was also signed with Timur Turlov to launch the magazine in Azerbaijan, Kazakhstan, Turkey, and Uzbekistan.

The digital edition Tatler Africa was launched in February 2025.

=== Tatler man and Mandarin man ===
From the first issue in 1977 the "Tatler man" was part of the magazines logo. In 1978 the "Mandarin man" (known as the Mandarin man due to the Tatler man "meeting" him at The Mandarin Hotel) appeared in the magazine as the Hong Kong counterpart of the Tatler man. The Mandarin man even replaced the Tatler man on the cover of the Chinese New Year special editions from 1982 to 1985.

In 1995 following a lawsuit by Condé Nast the Mandarin man replaced the Tatler man in the magazine logo. In 2007 the Mandarin man was removed from the magazines logo.

=== Lionel Messi controversy ===
In 2024, Tatler Asia sponsored and promoted a Hong Kong v Inter Miami friendly football match also known as Tatler XFEST Hong Kong. Argentine footballer Lionel Messi was reported to be appearing at the game, Tatler Asia having negotiated a contract with Inter Miami CF that Messi, Jordi Alba, and Sergio Busquets would all participate in the game, unless injured. Tatler expected Messi to be joining in, however 15 minutes before the match began, Tatler Asia CEO Michel Lamunière was informed that would not play due to injury.

The non-appearance of Messi led to chaos in the stadium and over 1,700 complaints with the Hong Kong consumer watchdog. Tatler Asia gave a 50% refund to all attendees of the match.

== Editions ==
=== Hong Kong ===
==== Operating ====
- Tatler Hong Kong Dining Guide (since 1984)
- Tatler GMT Hong Kong (since 2023)
- Tatler Hong Kong Homes (since 2011)

==== Defunct ====
- Hong Kong Tatler Couture
- Hong Kong Tatler Society
- Hong Kong Tatler Weddings

=== International ===
==== Operating ====
- Tatler Singapore (since 1982)
- Tatler Malaysia (since 1989)
- Tatler Thailand (1991–2021, since 2023)
- Tatler Indonesia (since 2000)
- Tatler Philippines (since 2001)
- Tatler Taiwan (since 2008)
- Tatler Macau (since 2008)
- 尚流 Tatler China (since 2011)
- Tatler Vietnam (since 2024)
- Tatler Kazakhstan (since 2024)
- Tatler Africa (since 2025)
- Tatler Japan (since 2026)

==== Defunct ====
- Beijing Tatler (2002–2010)
- Shanghai Tatler (2002–2010)
- Korea Tatler (2005–2009)
- Phuket Tatler (2008–2016)
- Jiangsu Tatler (2009–2010)
- Zhejiang Tatler; from 2009 to 2010
- Liaoning Tatler; from 2009 to 2010
- Sichuan Tatler; from 2009 to 2010
- Chongqing Tatler; from 2009 to 2010

== International editors ==
Country/region	Circulation dates	Editor-in-Chief	Start year	End year
Singapore (Tatler Singapore)	1982–present	Jane Ngiam	2008	2017
Singapore (Tatler Singapore)	1982–present	Kissa Castañeda	2017	2021
Singapore (Tatler Singapore)	1982–present	Karishma Tulsidas	2021	2022
Singapore (Tatler Singapore)	1982–present	Aun Koh	2023	present
Malaysia (Tatler Malaysia)	1991–present	Elizabeth Soong		
Malaysia (Tatler Malaysia)	1991–present	Lynette Ow	2022	present
Thailand (Tatler Thailand)	1991–2021	Colin Hastings	1991	1998
Thailand (Tatler Thailand)	1991–2021	Naphalai Areesorn	2001	2021
Thailand (Tatler Thailand)	2023–present	Apinya Dolan	2023	present
Thailand (Tatler Thailand)	2023–present	Natthawut Saengchuwong		present
Indonesia (Tatler Indonesia)	2000–present	Maria Lukito	2000	2017
Indonesia (Tatler Indonesia)	2000–present	Millie Stephanie Lukito	2017	
Indonesia (Tatler Indonesia)	2000–present	Judithya Pitana		present
Philippines (Tatler Philippines)	2001–present	Anton San Diego	2001	present
Taiwan (Tatler Taiwan)	2008–present	Celine Chang		2016
Taiwan (Tatler Taiwan)	2008–present	Tracy Huang	2016	2018
Taiwan (Tatler Taiwan)	2008–present	Yu Lee	2020	2022
Taiwan (Tatler Taiwan)	2008–present	Florence Lu	2022	present
Taiwan (Tatler Taiwan)	2008–present	Blues To		present
Macau (Tatler Macau)	2008–present	Steven Crane		
Macau (Tatler Macau)	2008–present	Claire Breen Melwani	2016	2016
Macau (Tatler Macau)	2008–present	Andrea Lo		present
China (尚流 Tatler/Shangliu Tatler)	2011–present	Chen Ruijun		2018
China (尚流 Tatler/Shangliu Tatler)	2011–present	Yang Liping	2018	
Vietnam (Tatler Vietnam)	2024–present	Nikita Chu	2024	present
Kazakhstan (Tatler Kazakhstan)	2024–present	Nikolay Uskov	2024	present

== See also ==
- Tatler, British society magazine
