= Woman's Journal (Philippines) =

Women's magazine in the Philippines

The Women's Journal was one of the oldest and longest-running women's magazines in the Philippines, having been in publication since 1973. It is published monthly by Philippine Journalists, which also publishes the People's Journal and People's Journal Tonight. They are also the publishers of the now-defunct Times Journal, a Philippine national daily which existed during the Marcos regime.

The Women's Journal was originally published every Saturday on a weekly basis, from its inception in 1973 until 2007–08 in order to be at par with the Philippine versions of international women's magazines.

== The Woman's Journal ==
The Woman's Journal was an older Philippine women's magazine active in the 1930s.
