= Nam District =

- Hangul: 남구
- Hanja: 南區
- RR: Nam-gu
- MR: Nam-gu

Nam District (Korean: 남구), or "Southern District", is the name of a gu in several South Korean cities:

- Nam District, Busan
- Nam District, Daegu
- Nam District, Gwangju
- Nam District, Incheon
- Nam District, Pohang
- Nam District, Ulsan
