= Southern District =

The Southern District or South District may refer to:

== Government ==
=== Africa ===
- Southern District (Botswana)
- Southern District Municipality, South Africa
- South District (Zanzibar)

=== Asia ===
- Southern District, Hong Kong
- Southern District (Israel)
- South District, Taichung, Taiwan
- South District, Tainan, Taiwan
- For Southern Districts (ku) in Japanese cities see Minami-ku
- For Southern Districts (gu) in Korean cities see Nam-gu

=== Australia ===
- Southern District (South Australian Legislative Council), an electoral district 1882–1975

== Religion ==
- Southern District (LCMS) in the Lutheran Church - Missouri Synod

== See also ==
- , for U.S. judicial districts containing "Southern District"
- Southern Districts (disambiguation)
