= Minami-ku =

Minami ku (南区) is the name of several wards located in various cities in Japan. The name literally translated to Southern District, and hence it is a very common ward name.

- Sapporo: see Minami-ku, Sapporo
- Niigata: see Minami-ku, Niigata
- Saitama: see Minami-ku, Saitama
- Yokohama: see Minami-ku, Yokohama
- Sagamihara: see Minami-ku, Sagamihara
- Hamamatsu:see Minami-ku, Hamamatsu
- Nagoya: see Minami-ku, Nagoya
- Kyoto: see Minami-ku, Kyoto
- Sakai: see Minami-ku, Sakai
- Okayama:see Minami-ku, Okayama
- Hiroshima: see Minami-ku, Hiroshima
- Fukuoka: see Minami-ku, Fukuoka
- Kumamoto: see Minami-ku, Kumamoto
- Minami-ku of Osaka merged with Higashi ward and is now part of the ward Chūō-ku
