= AutoIndustriya.com =

Gear heads literature

- Website type: Online magazine
- Available in: English
- Owners: AutoIndustriya.com, Inc.
- Creator: 10+ professional editorial team
- Editor: Vince Pornelos
- Website: www.autoindustriya.com
- Commercial: Yes
- Launched: September 25, 2000; 26 years ago
- Current status: Active

AutoIndustriya.com is a Philippine-based online automobile magazine. It is considered the longest consistently running independent automotive online publication in the Philippines.

== History ==
AutoIndustriya.com was founded on September 25, 2000 by Brent Co and Benjamin Ngo Jr.

== Content ==
AutoIndustriya.com provides up-to-date automotive industry news as well as car reviews and an automotive discussion forum. The website also has an Auto Shop Guide where users can search for vehicles and services within their area. A car buyers guide featuring more than 700 new vehicles available in the Philippine market was one of the newer features added. The site also covers news and reviews for trucks and buses. AutoIndustriya.com has also expanded to content creation with an active YouTube channel showing high-quality automotive video content. The brand is also active on social media channels on Facebook, Instagram, Tiktok, and X.

The sections on the website are as follows:

Main segments

- Auto News
- Car Deals
- Car Reviews
- Feature Stories
- CARambla
- Eat/Sip/Drive
- Editor's Note
- The Inside Man
- Product Reviews

Buyers Guide

- New Car Buyers Guide
- Auto Shop Guide
- Auto 101
- Car Financing
- Car Warranty
- Auto Insurance Basics

== Events ==
The site has also organized several events in the past. Three of which were called 'Ignition'. The site's latest event called 'Speedfest' was also the biggest so far, attracting more than one hundred twenty cars and about two thousand people to Subic Bay International Airport. The two-day event featured a Mile-Run, a Quarter-Mile Drag Race, and Gymkhana Time Trials. AutoIndustriya.com celebrated their 21 years with the release of their Viber sticker pack.

In 2025, AutoIndustriya.com celebrated its 25th anniversary with a summer kick-off car meet called Hot Summer Meet at Ayala Malls Manila Bay and a week-long event in Greenhills called AutoIndustriya Car Week.

== Awards ==
The site was awarded the DigitalFilipino Web Award for Best Automotive Website for two consecutive years in 2008 and 2009.

Then Associate Editor Vince Pornelos was awarded 'Best Motoring Column' at the 2010 Henry Ford Awards. At the 2012 Henry Ford Awards Contributing Editor Iñigo Roces was recognized as 'Best Smart Technology Feature' and runner-up for the 'Best Green Technology Feature Story'; Vince Pornelos was recognized first runner-up for the 'Automotive Online Feature' and 'Ford Go Further Feature Story' categories. Brent Co was awarded Best Online Photo at the 4th Philippine International Motor Show Media Awards.

In the 15th Henry Ford Awards held in 2016, Editor-in-Chief Vince Pornelos was awarded 'Best Automotive Road Safety Feature', while News Editor Martin Aguilar was recognized as first runner-up in the 'Automotive Online Feature' category.

In 2018, at the 17th Henry Ford Awards, Editor-in-Chief Vince Pornelos was awarded 'Best Smart Technology Feature', while Inigo Roces won the 'Best Automotive Safety Feature'.

For the 18th edition of the Henry Ford Awards, AutoIndustriya.com brought home four awards. Inigo Roces was awarded 'Best Automotive Industry Feature', while Eric Tipan won the 'Best Automotive Online Lifestyle Feature'. Dominating the photography categories, Jet Rabe won the 'Best Published Photograph' title, as Kelvin Christian Go was awarded 'Best Published Ford Photo'.

At the 19th Henry Ford Awards, AutoIndustriya.com took home five wins with EIC Vince Pornelos winning 'Best Automotive Industry Feature', Eric Tipan took home 'Best Automotive Online Lifestyle Feature', photographers cornered both photo categories where Kelvin Christian Go won 'Best Ford Automotive Photograph', while Jenna Genio was heralded 'Best Automotive Photograph' award. Last but not least, AutoIndustriya took home its first video category win with the 'Best Ford Automotive Video Feature' entered by John Barney Biscocho.

In the most recently held 20th Henry Ford Awards, Editor-in-Chief Vince Pornelos took home the 'Best Automotive Online Feature', and the 'Best Automotive Video Feature' with two other AutoIndustriya.com entries nominated as the three finalists.

In 2023, AutoIndustriya.com's YouTube channel received its Silver Play Button from the YouTube Creator Awards for achieving 100,000 subscribers.

== Partnerships ==
AutoIndustriya.com is consistently an event partner of major auto shows in the Philippines. These are: the Philippine International Motor Show, Manila International Auto Show, Trans Sport Show and the Manila Auto Salon. The site has also partnered with the 2015 AAITF Bangkok (Automotive Aftermarket International Trade Fair) held in Thailand and the 2026 Impact Speed Fest to be held in Thailand.
