= Mitsubishi Zinger =

Compact MPV

CMC Zinger
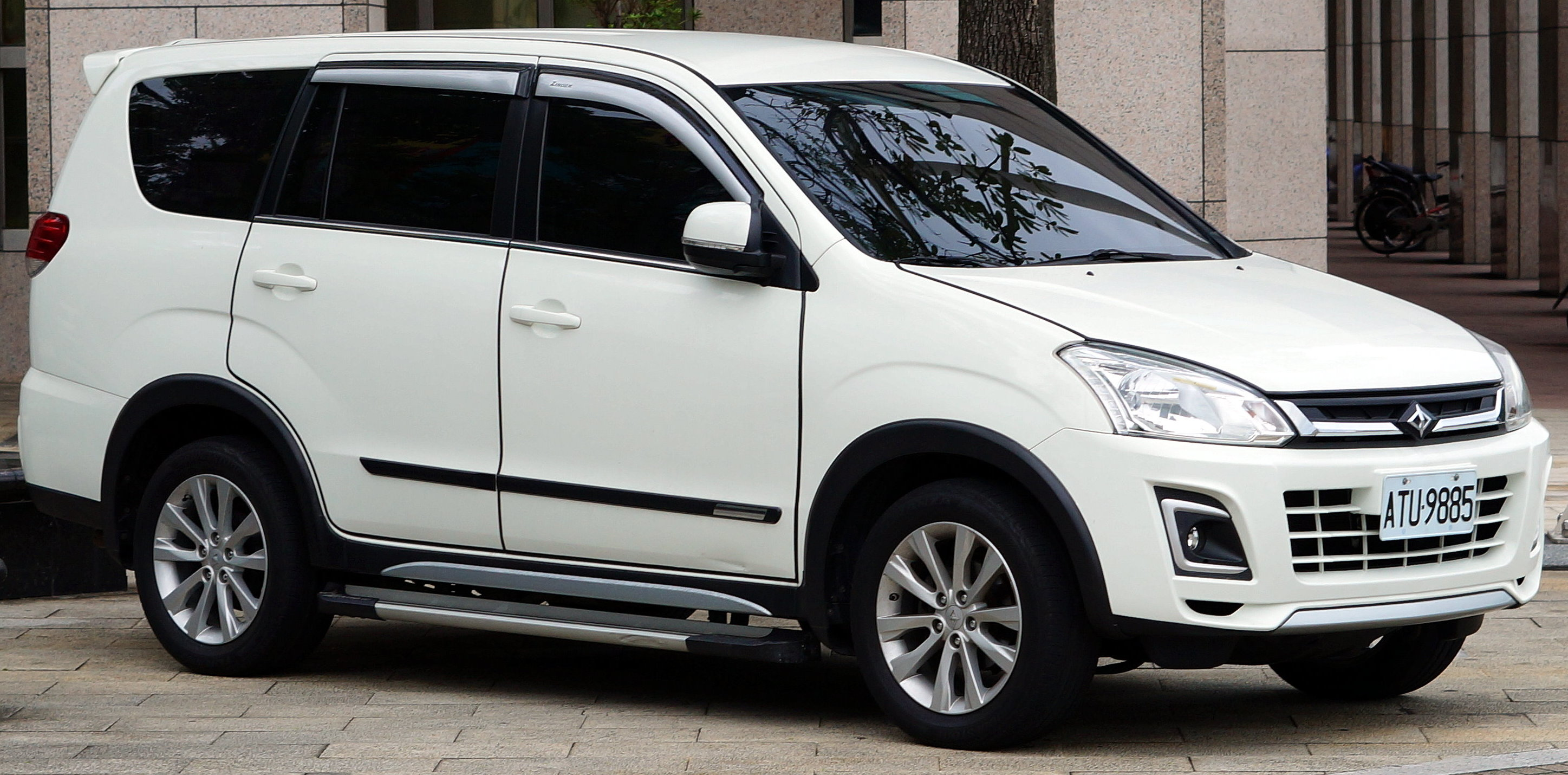

Overview
- Manufacturer: Mitsubishi Motors; China Motor Corporation
- Also called: Mitsubishi Zinger (2005–2015); Mitsubishi Fuzion (Philippines); Soueast Zinger; CMC Z7
- Production: 2005–present
- Assembly: Taiwan (China Motor) (2005–present); China (Soueast) (2007); Philippines (MMPC) (2007–2014)

Body and chassis
- Class: Compact MPV; Compact pickup truck (Taiwan only)
- Body style: 5-door station wagon; 2-door pickup truck (Taiwan only)
- Layout: Longitudinal Front-engine, rear-wheel-drive
- Related: Mitsubishi Pajero Sport; Mitsubishi Triton

Powertrain
- Engine: 2.0 L 4G63 I4; 2.4 L 4G64 I4; 2.4 L 4G69 I4; 1.5 L 4A95TD Turbo I4
- Transmission: 5-speed manual; 4-speed M88 automatic; 5-speed automatic; 8-speed ZF Automatic

Dimensions
- Wheelbase: 2,720 mm (107.1 in)
- Length: Mitsubishi Zinger: 4,585 mm (180.5 in); CMC Zinger: 4,640 mm (182.7 in) (2019 facelift); 4,665 mm (183.7 in) (new-generation); CMC Zinger Pickup: 4,660 mm (183.5 in); 4,749 mm (187.0 in) (Three opening type)
- Width: 1,750–1,840 mm (68.9–72.4 in)
- Height: 1,775–1,880 mm (69.9–74.0 in)

Chronology
- Predecessor: Mitsubishi Freeca/Adventure (Taiwan/Philippines)
- Successor: Mitsubishi Xpander (Mitsubishi Fuzion, Philippines); Mitsubishi Destinator

The Mitsubishi Zinger (CMC Zinger (Chinese: 中華雙贏) in Taiwan since 2015) is a compact MPV designed by Mitsubishi Motors in conjunction with the China Motor Corporation and produced since December 2005.

== Overview ==
The name derives from a "person or something full of energy and vitality". From 2007 until 2016, it has also been marketed in the Philippines as the Mitsubishi Fuzion, as the company claims it "merges together the best characteristics of [three] vehicles, the sporty character and ruggedness of an SUV, the spaciousness and versatility of a van, and riding comfort of a passenger car".

The first month's sales were 2,285, substantially exceeding the 1,200/month initial target. The companies planned to expand into mainland China in the second half of 2007 when a joint-production venture between CMC and South East (Fujian) Motor Co., Ltd. came onstream.

The automatic model engine was replaced by a 4G69 MIVEC-equipped version at the end of 2008, in order to meet new emissions standards. The 5-speed manual model still uses the 4G64 engine.

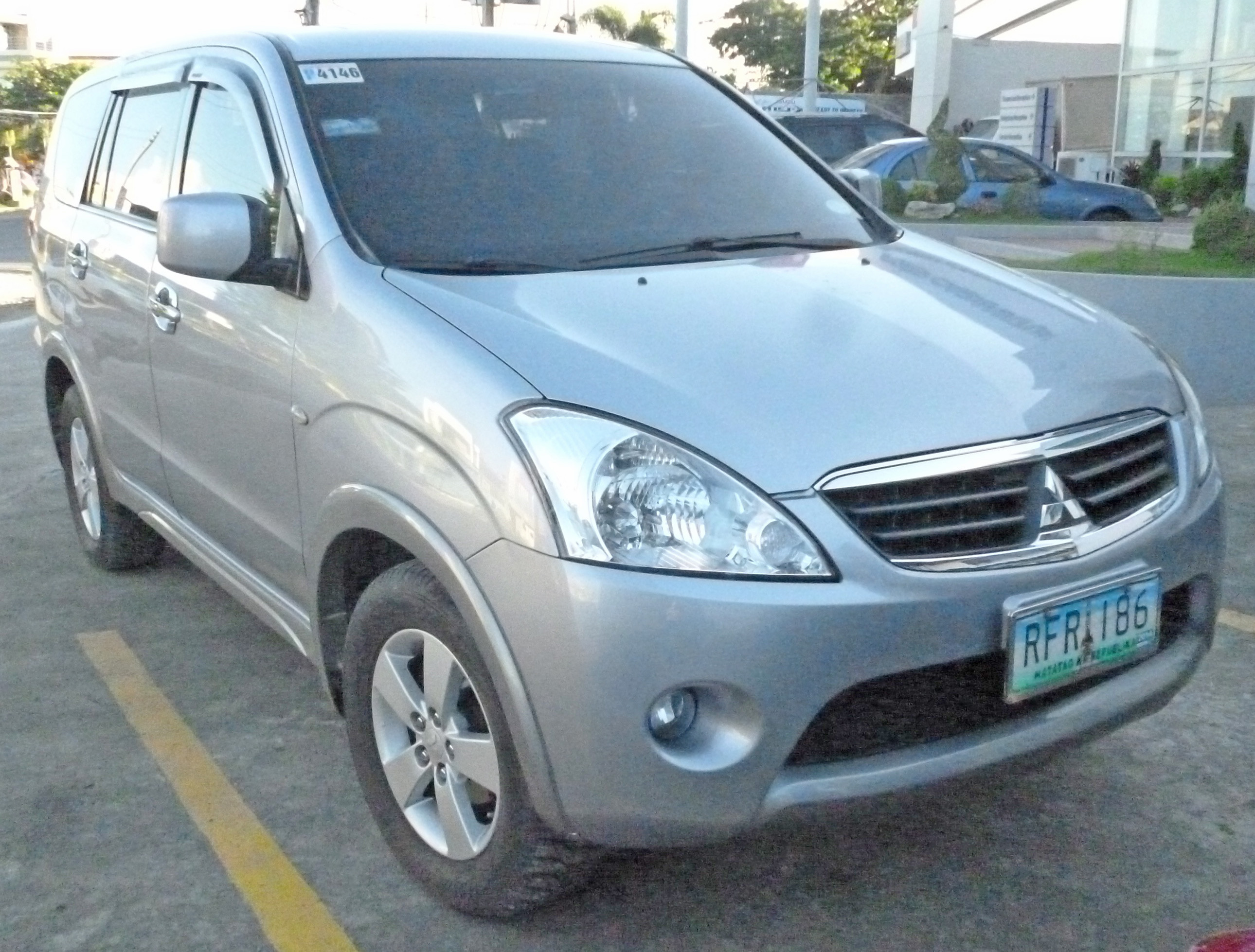
Mitsubishi Fuzion 2.4 GLS Sport (Philippines)

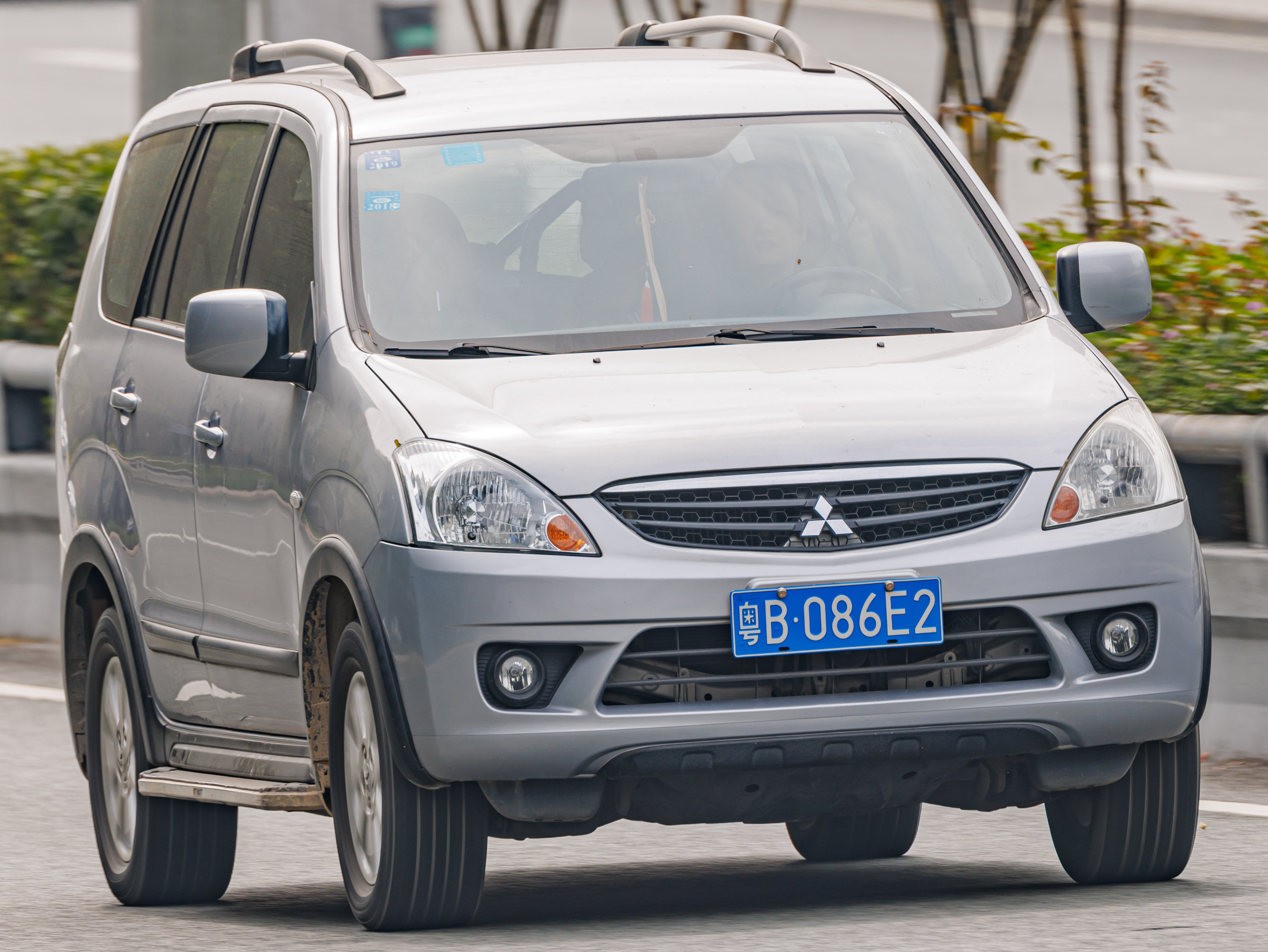
Mitsubishi Zinger (China; facelift)

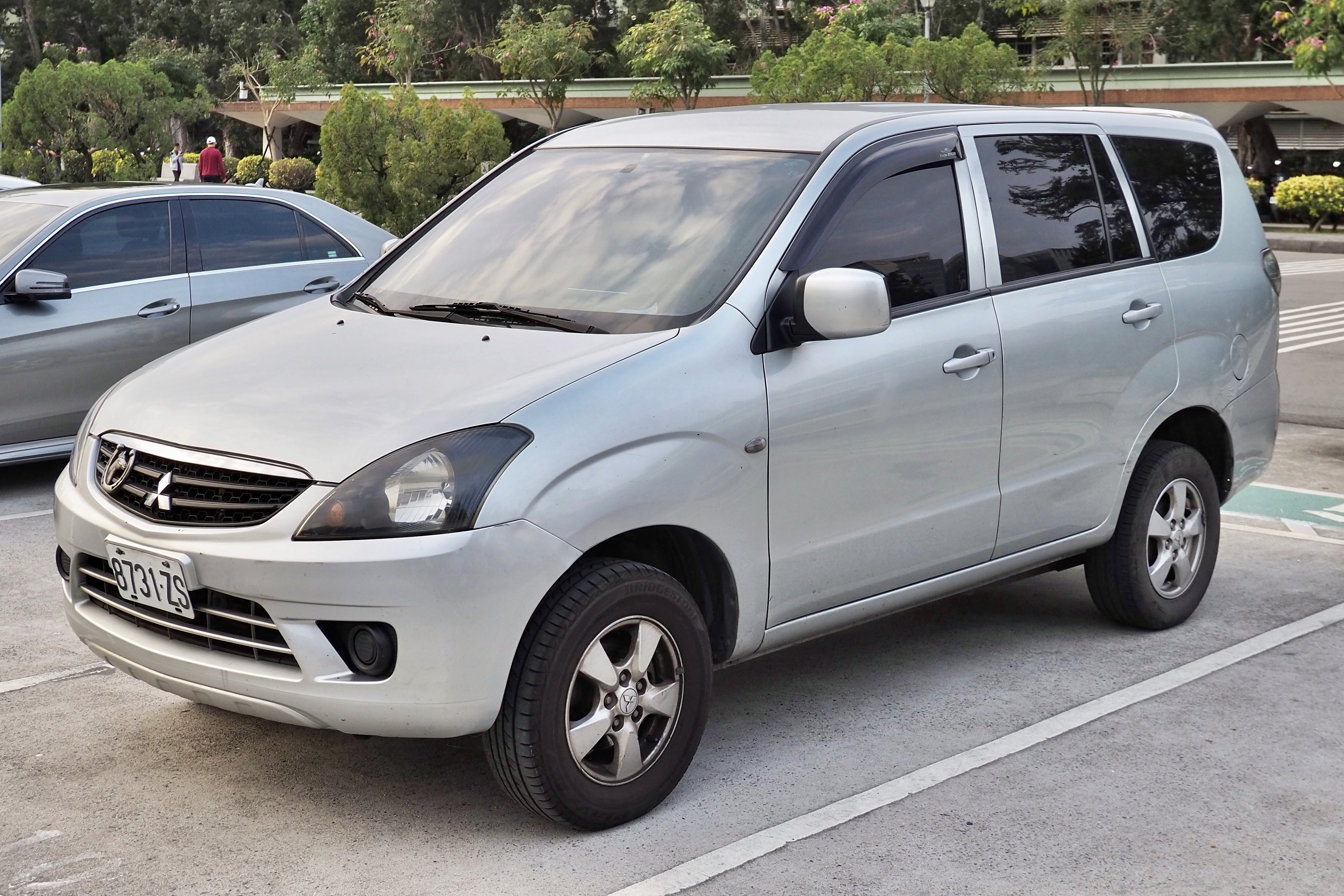
Mitsubishi Zinger (Taiwan; facelift)

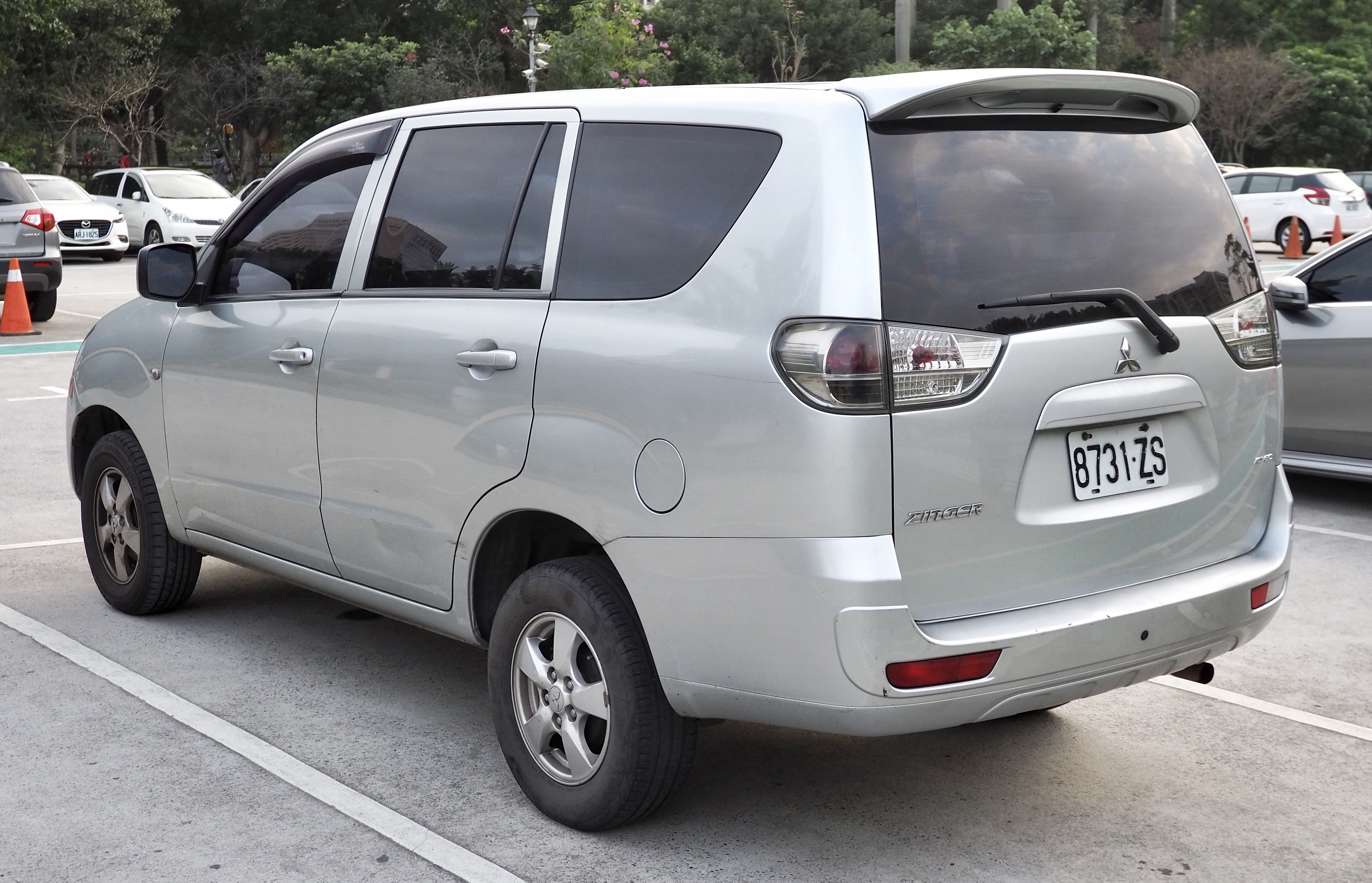
Mitsubishi Zinger (Taiwan; facelift)

=== Rebadge and discontinuation outside of Taiwan ===
In October 2015, the 4G69 engine was detuned from 159 to 136 PS (157 to 134 hp; 117 to 100 kW) with peak torque engine speed lowered from 4,500 to 2,300 rpm, incorporated with a new 5-speed automatic transmission, which replaced both the earlier 4-speed automatic as well as the manual transmission. In Taiwan, from 2015 the Zinger received a mild facelift, and was transferred into a product branded as CMC following the recent change of CMC repositioning itself as a domestic Taiwanese car brand. The facelift includes CMC logo replacements and the signature CMC front grille and bumper design.

The Mitsubishi Fuzion was removed from the Mitsubishi Philippines website in 2016. The Xpander, which is built at Mitsubishi Motors Krama Yudha Indonesia served as the replacement to the Fuzion and the Adventure due to the engine not meeting Euro 4 standards and some safety issues. The Xpander was not exported to China and Taiwan markets due to Mitsubishi's decision to decline release of Mitsubishi Xpander and distribute to China Motor Corporation.

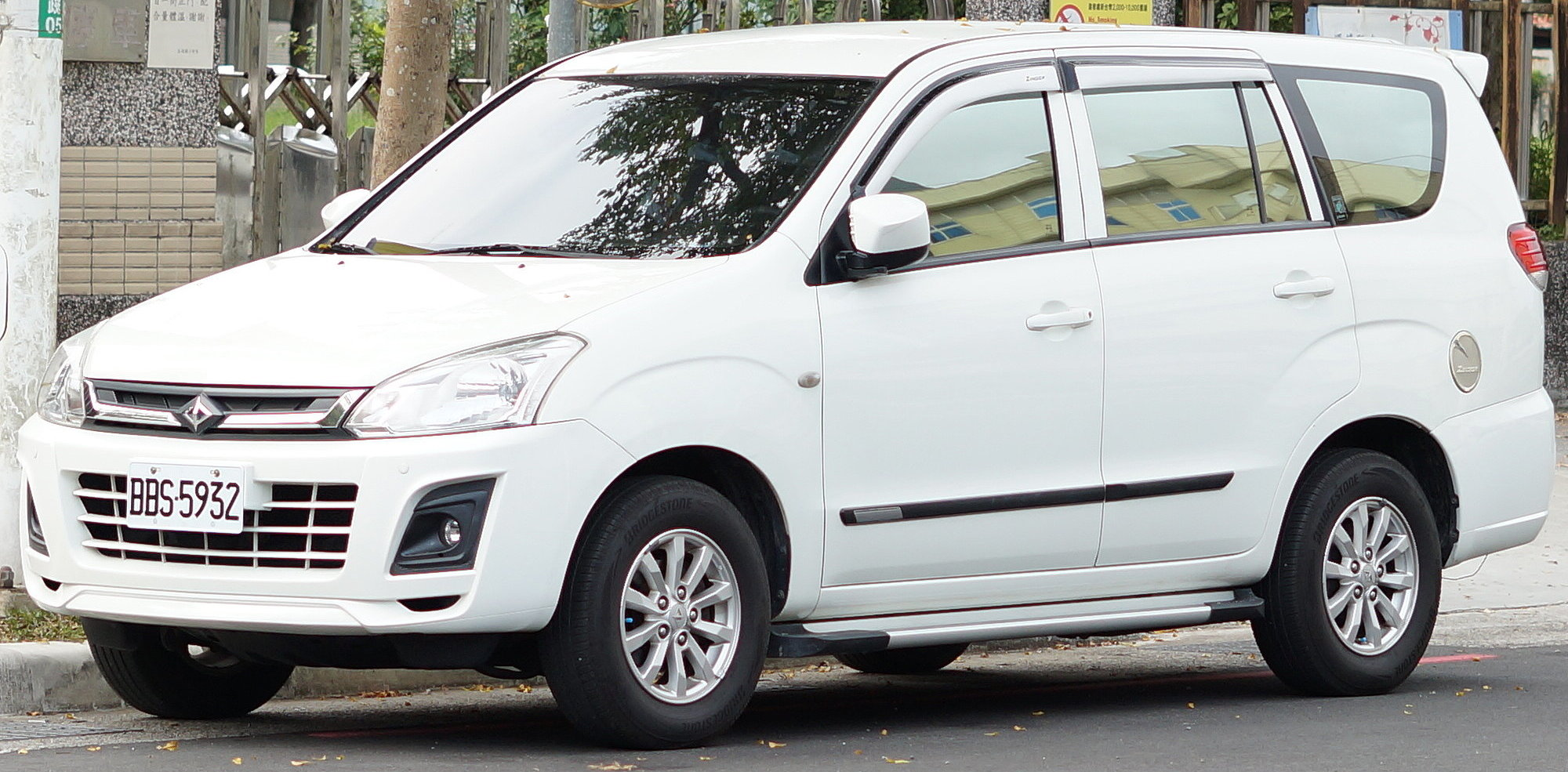
CMC Zinger pre-facelift front

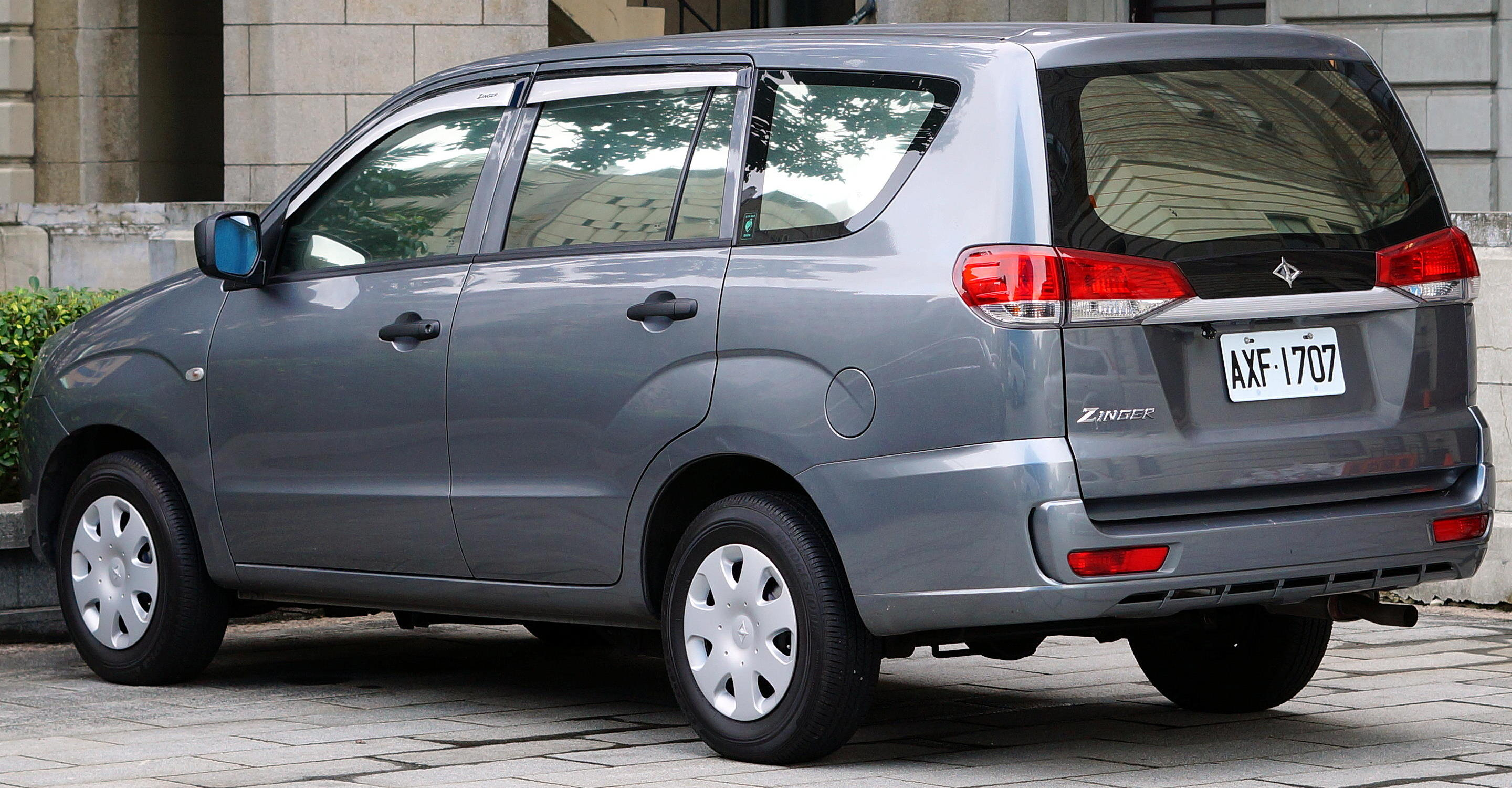
CMC Zinger pre-facelift rear

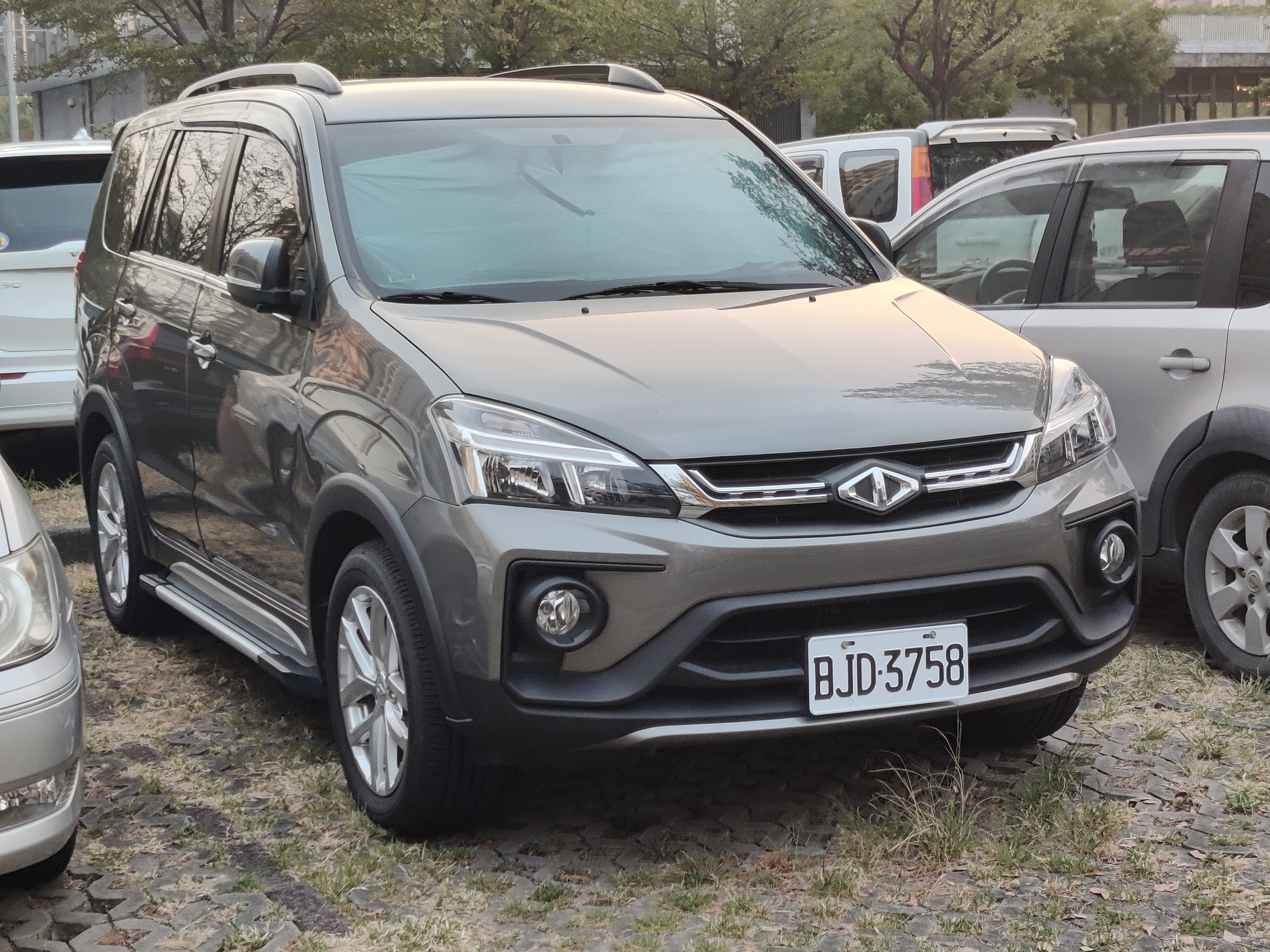
CMC Zinger 2019 facelift front

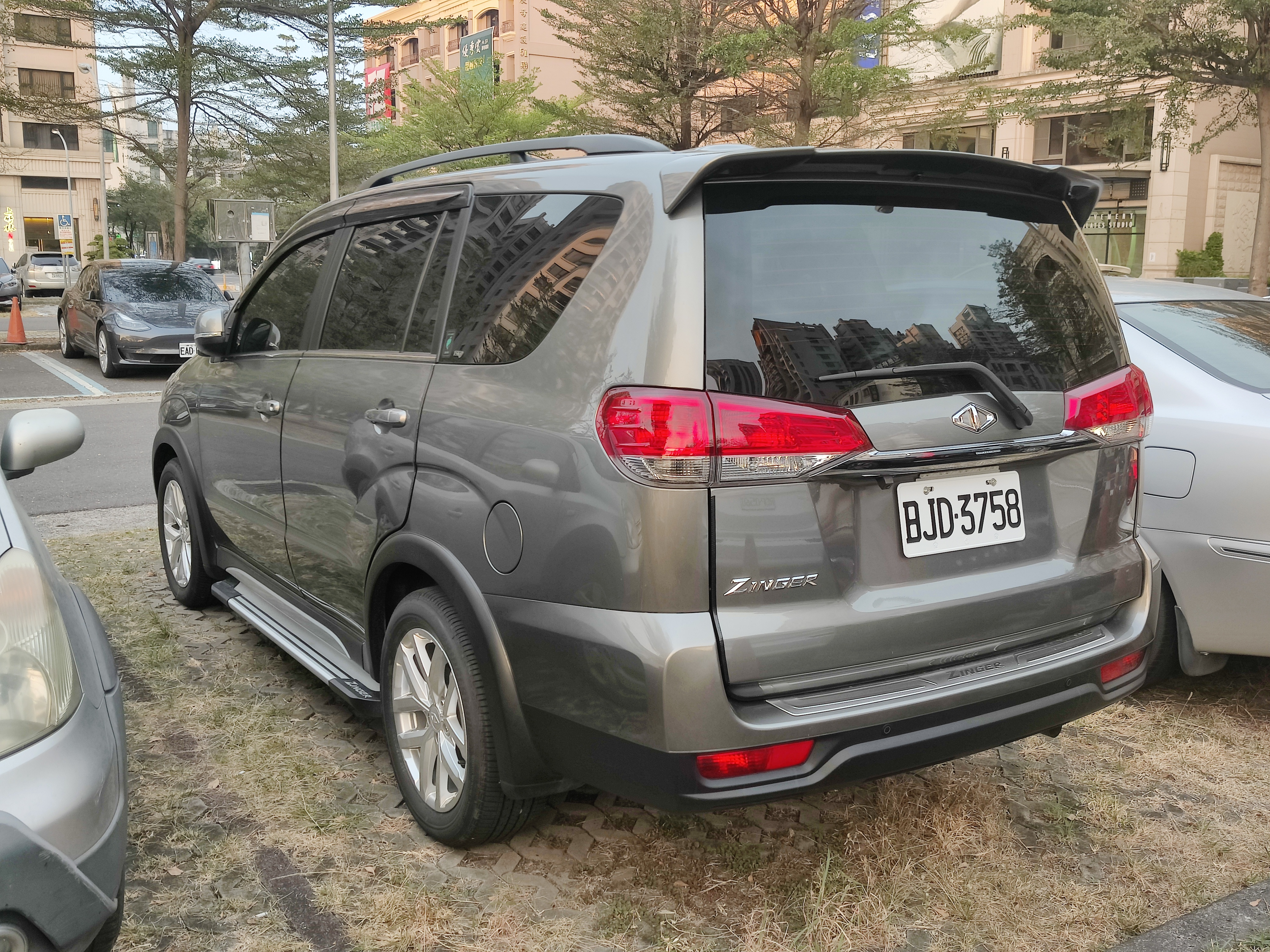
CMC Zinger 2019 facelift rear

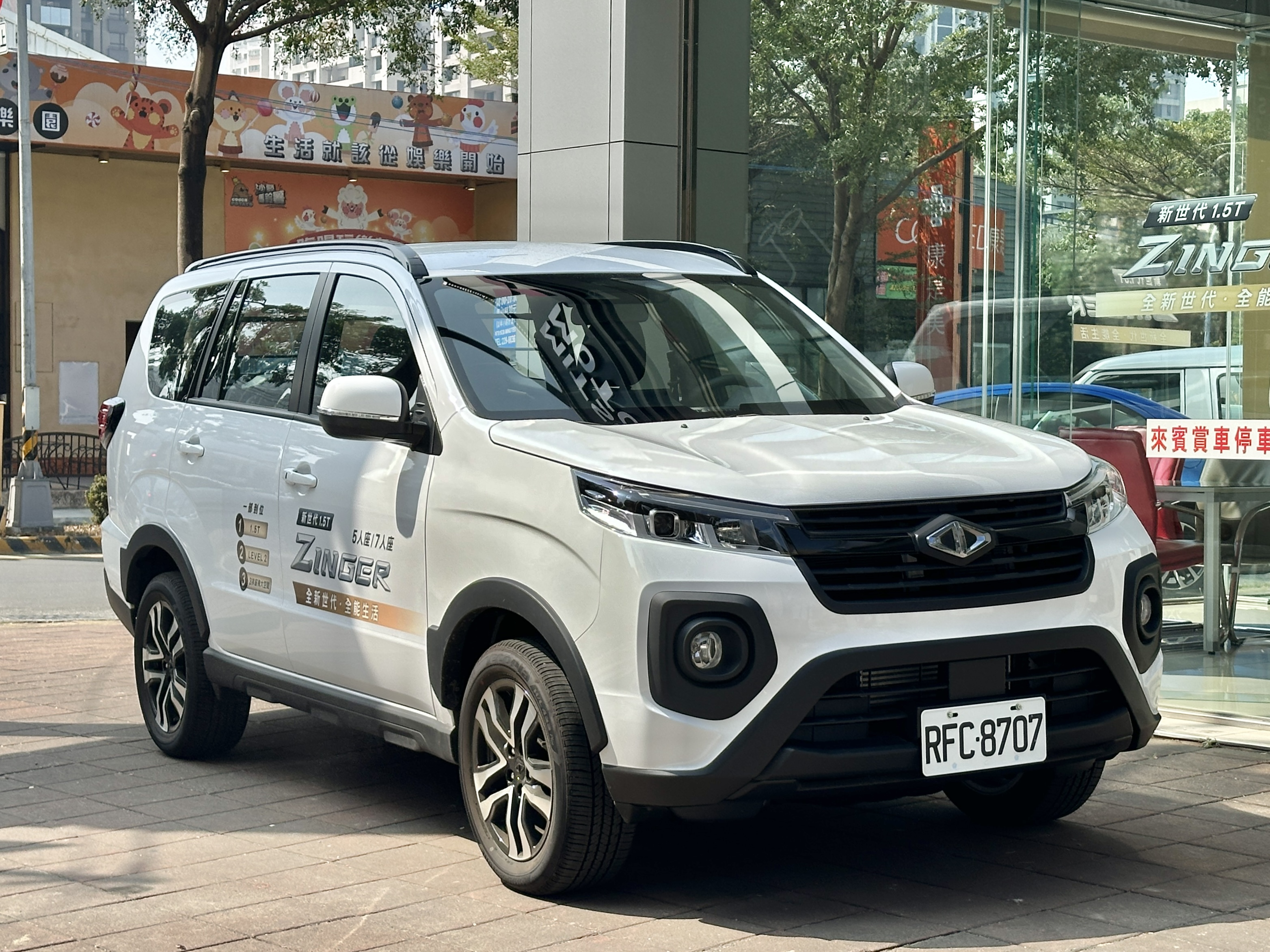
2024 CMC new generation Zinger front

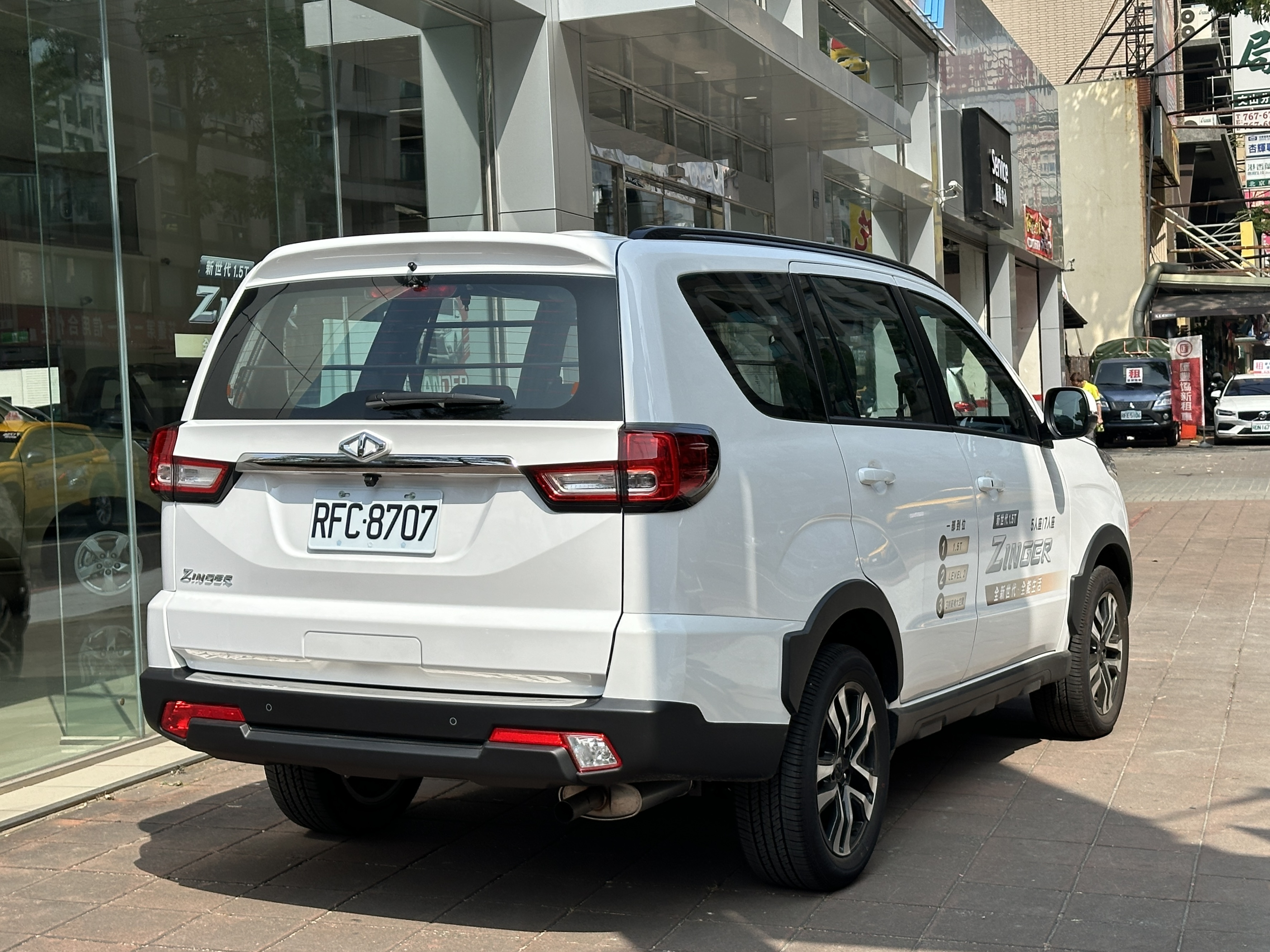
2024 CMC new generation Zinger rear

=== CMC Zinger Pickup ===
As of September 2020, a 2-door compact pickup truck variant of the CMC Zinger was available in the Taiwanese market. It features a 1,703-millimetre-long (67.0 in) bed with a 710-kilogram (1,570 lb) payload capacity. The Zinger pickup is based on the 2019 facelift Zinger model with everything before the B-pillars shared with the station wagon body style and tail lamps from the CMC Veryca A180 van. The 4G69 2.4-litre 16-valve inline-four unit was also shared, producing 136 PS (134 hp; 100 kW) at 5,250 rpm and 206 N⋅m (152 lb⋅ft) of torque at 2,300 rpm. This is mated to a 5-speed automatic gearbox sourced from Hyundai and rear-wheel drive.

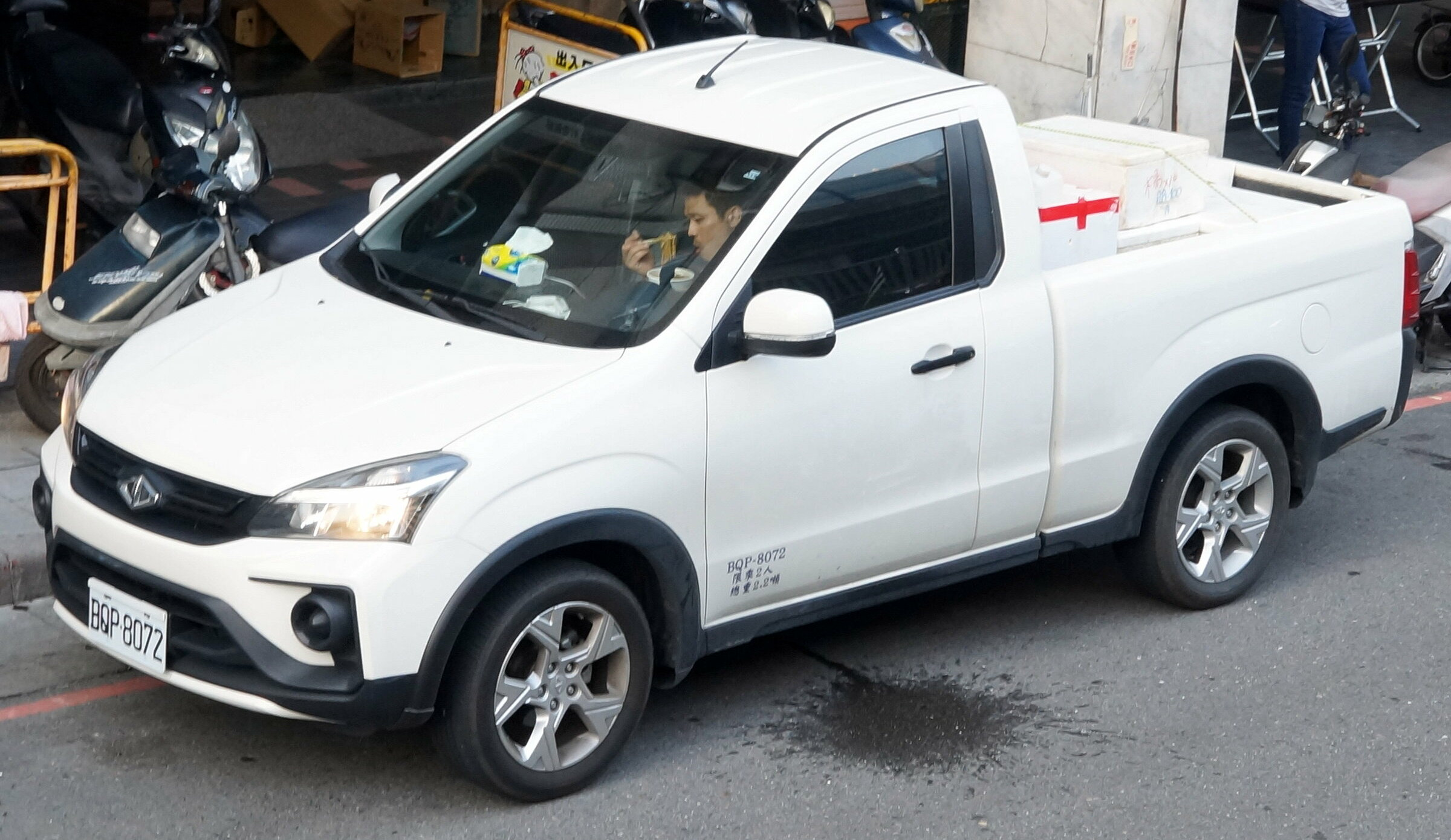
CMC Zinger 2-door pickup front

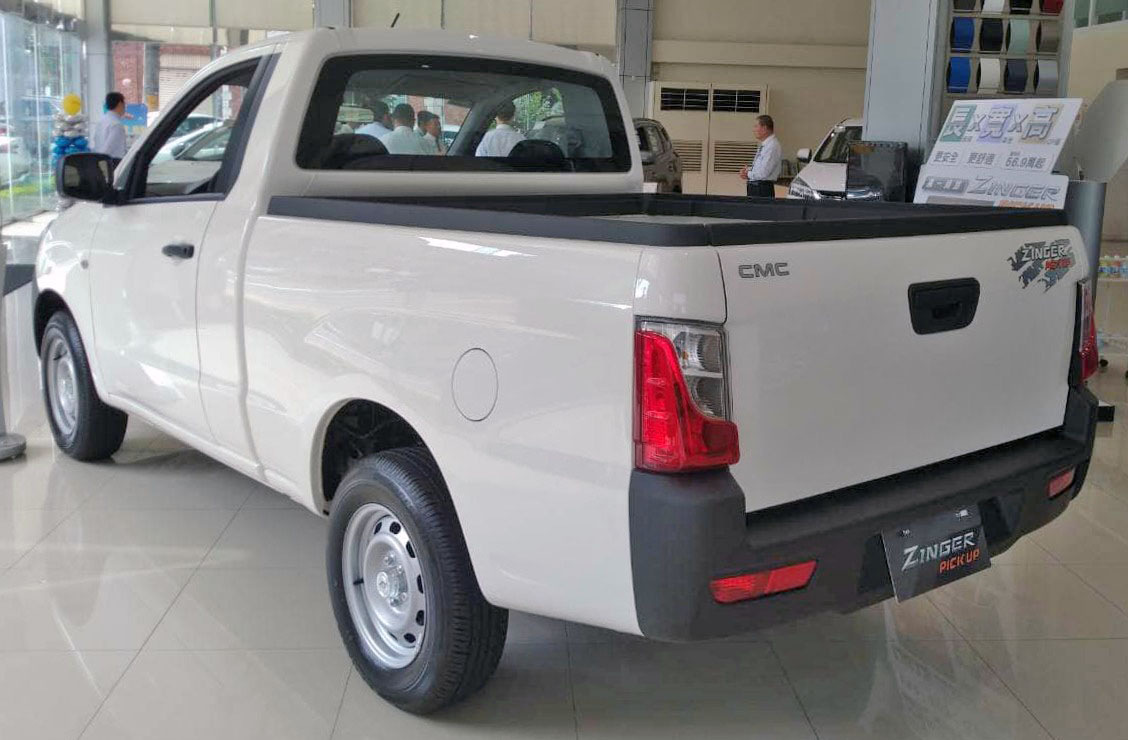
CMC Zinger 2-door pickup rear

== Safety ==
TNCAP test results CMC Zinger 'Standard' (5-seater) (2026, adapted from Euro NCAP 2022)
Test	Points	%
Overall:	0 /5 stars	
Adult occupant:	16.687	43%
Child occupant:	16.278	33%
Pedestrian:	19.529	40%
Safety assist:	0	0%
