= Mitsubishi Freeca =

Vehicle manufactured by Mitsubishi Motors from 1997 to 2017

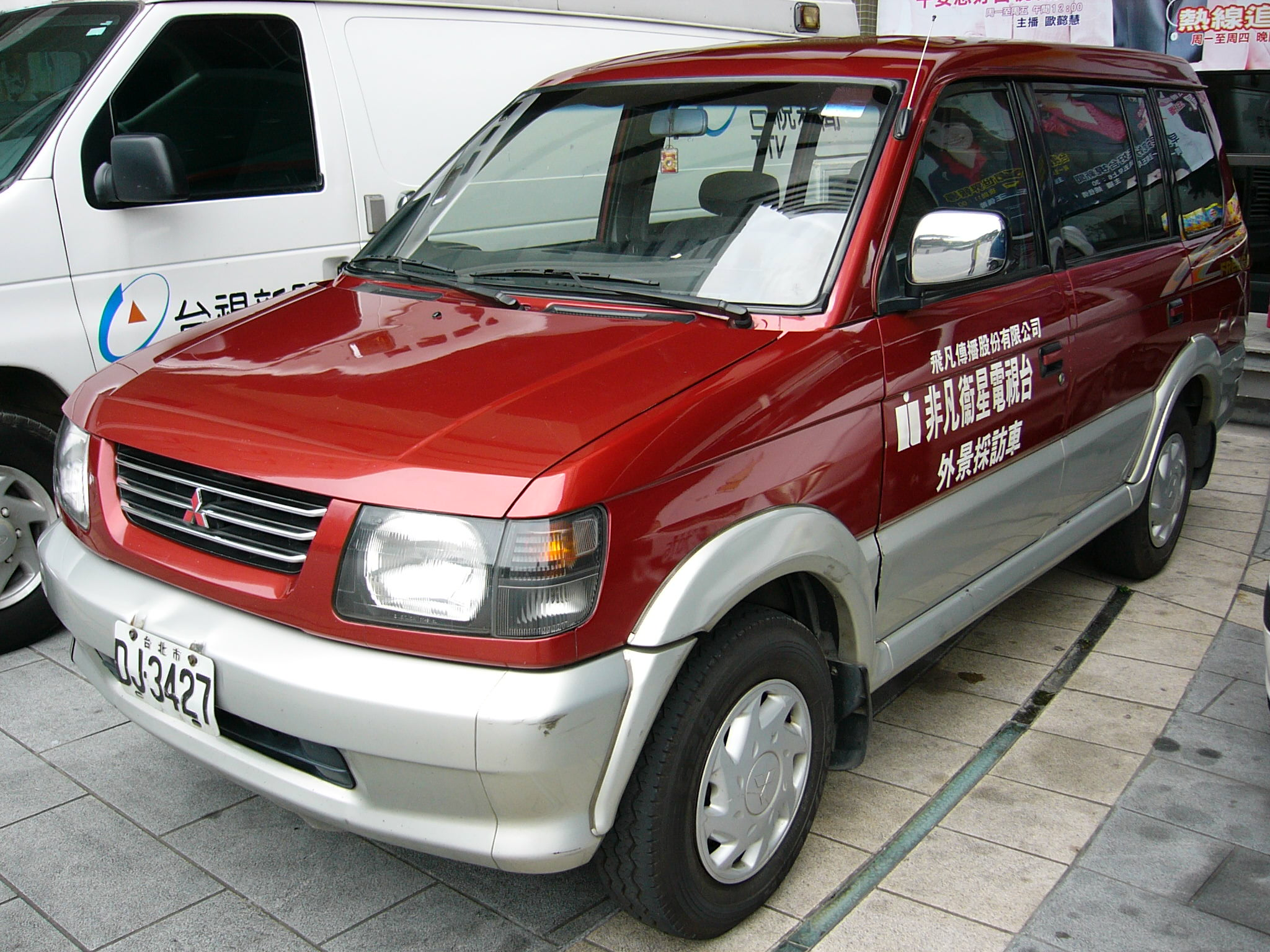
- Mitsubishi Freeca (pre-facelift, Taiwan)

Overview
- Manufacturer: Mitsubishi Motors; China Motor Corporation
- Model code: VA; VB
- Also called: Mitsubishi Freeca (Taiwan); Mitsubishi Adventure (Philippines); Mitsubishi Kuda (Indonesia); Mitsubishi Jolie (Vietnam); Soueast Freeca (China); Africar Landio/Jockey (South Africa)
- Production: 1997–2007 (Taiwan); 1998–2017 (Philippines); March 1999–May 2005 (Indonesia); 1998–2007 (Vietnam); 2001–2017 (China)
- Assembly: Taiwan: Yangmei, Taoyuan County (now Taoyuan City) (China Motor); Philippines: Cainta (until 2015); Santa Rosa (2015–2017) (MMPC); Indonesia: Jakarta (KKM); China: Qing Kou, Min Hou, Fuzhou; South Africa: Cape Town; Vietnam: Hồ Chí Minh City (Mekong Auto Corporation)

Body and chassis
- Class: Compact station wagon; Compact pickup truck (Taiwan only)
- Body style: 5-door wagon; 2-door pickup (Taiwan only)
- Layout: Front-engine, rear-wheel-drive
- Chassis: Body-on-frame

Powertrain
- Engine: Petrol: 1.6 L 4G18 SOHC I4 (Indonesia); 2.0 L 4G63A SOHC I4; 2.0 L 4G94 16-valve I4 (China); Diesel: 2.5 L 4D56 SOHC I4
- Transmission: 5-speed manual; 4-speed automatic

Dimensions
- Wheelbase: 2,620 mm (103.1 in)
- Length: 4,320–4,375–4,410–4,655 mm (170.1–172.2–173.6–183.3 in)
- Width: 1,650–1,690–1,750 mm (65.0–66.5–68.9 in)
- Height: 1,800–1,830 mm (70.9–72.0 in)
- Curb weight: 1,445–1,500 kg (3,186–3,307 lb)

Chronology
- Successor: Mitsubishi Zinger/Fuzion (Freeca/Adventure); Mitsubishi Maven (Kuda); Mitsubishi Xpander (Adventure/Kuda/Jolie); Mitsubishi Destinator (Adventure/Kuda/Jolie)

The Mitsubishi Freeca is a station wagon and pickup truck produced by Mitsubishi Motors between 1997 and 2017. The model was designed for the Asian market, and built in Taiwan, China, the Philippines, Indonesia and Vietnam.

The model name "Freeca" is coined from "free" and "ca", the Taiwanese for vehicle. It was marketed as the Mitsubishi Adventure in the Philippines, Mitsubishi Kuda in Indonesia and Mitsubishi Jolie in Vietnam.

== Overview ==
The Mitsubishi Freeca was first released on 11 September 1997, while the Adventure and Kuda was released in January 1998 and March 1999 respectively.

The vehicle was internally referred to as the Dynamic Family Wagon (DFW). It has a "semi-bonnet" design with a rear-wheel drive layout and body-on-frame chassis. Product development and parts production were shared between Taiwan, the Philippines and Indonesia.

== Markets ==
=== China ===
From 2001 to 2017, the Freeca was rebadged by the Soueast brand for China.

=== Indonesia ===
This vehicle was released in March 1999 as the Mitsubishi Kuda. Initially offered in three variants: GLX, GLS, and Super Exceed, powered by a 1.6 L 4G18 petrol engine. The diesel models were released in June 1999 in two variants: GLS, and GLX. The diesel variant of Super Exceed then released in 2000.

A facelift model was received in early 2002. The 2.0 L 4G63A engine was added. The variant names have also changed: Deluxe, Diamond and Grandia. The Mitsubishi Kuda got another facelift in 2004.

It was manufactured locally by PT Krama Yudha Kesuma Motor and marketed by Krama Yudha Tiga Berlian. Production ceased in May 2005 along with the closure of the assembly plant. The Kuda means horse in both Indonesian and Malay.

=== Philippines ===
In the Philippines, the Adventure was given major redesigns in 2001 and 2004, then a minor facelift in late 2009. Trims include the GLX, GLX SE, GLS Sport, Super Sport and Grand Sport. The 50,000th Adventure was manufactured in the Philippines plant in March 2005.

The original pre-facelift model continued to be sold in 2006 as the Adventure GX with the front of the first facelift. It was sold alongside the second and third facelift model. It was essentially a stripped down Adventure meant for commercial or fleet use. The "GX" serves as the most basic base-model of the Adventure lineup. Another version of the Adventure GX, called the Adventure TX, was made specifically to be used for taxicabs/UV Express use, although the TX is seen more of a trim on the Adventure GX rather than another version of the car. Production of the Adventure ended in 2017, but few remaining units were sold until 2018 in some dealerships.

=== South Africa ===
Badge engineered Taiwanese-made Freecas were also briefly available in the South African market, locally assembled in Cape Town and sold as the Africar Landio and Africar Jockey.

=== Taiwan ===
The vehicle was marketed as the Mitsubishi Freeca in Taiwan in either pickup or station wagon body styles. The station wagon was primarily marketed as a recreational vehicle with notable features such as anti-lock brakes with electronic brake force distribution and VHS or 5.1 surround DVD infotainment systems being unavailable in the facelifted 8-seater Exceed trim (replacing the Top spec 7 Seater Super Exceed). The sole engine choice was the 2.0-litre 4G63 with either a carburetor or multi-point fuel injection. Fuel injection was later made standard across all vehicles.

=== Vietnam ===
The vehicle was marketed as the Mitsubishi Jolie in Vietnam.

== Gallery ==
Mitsubishi Freeca

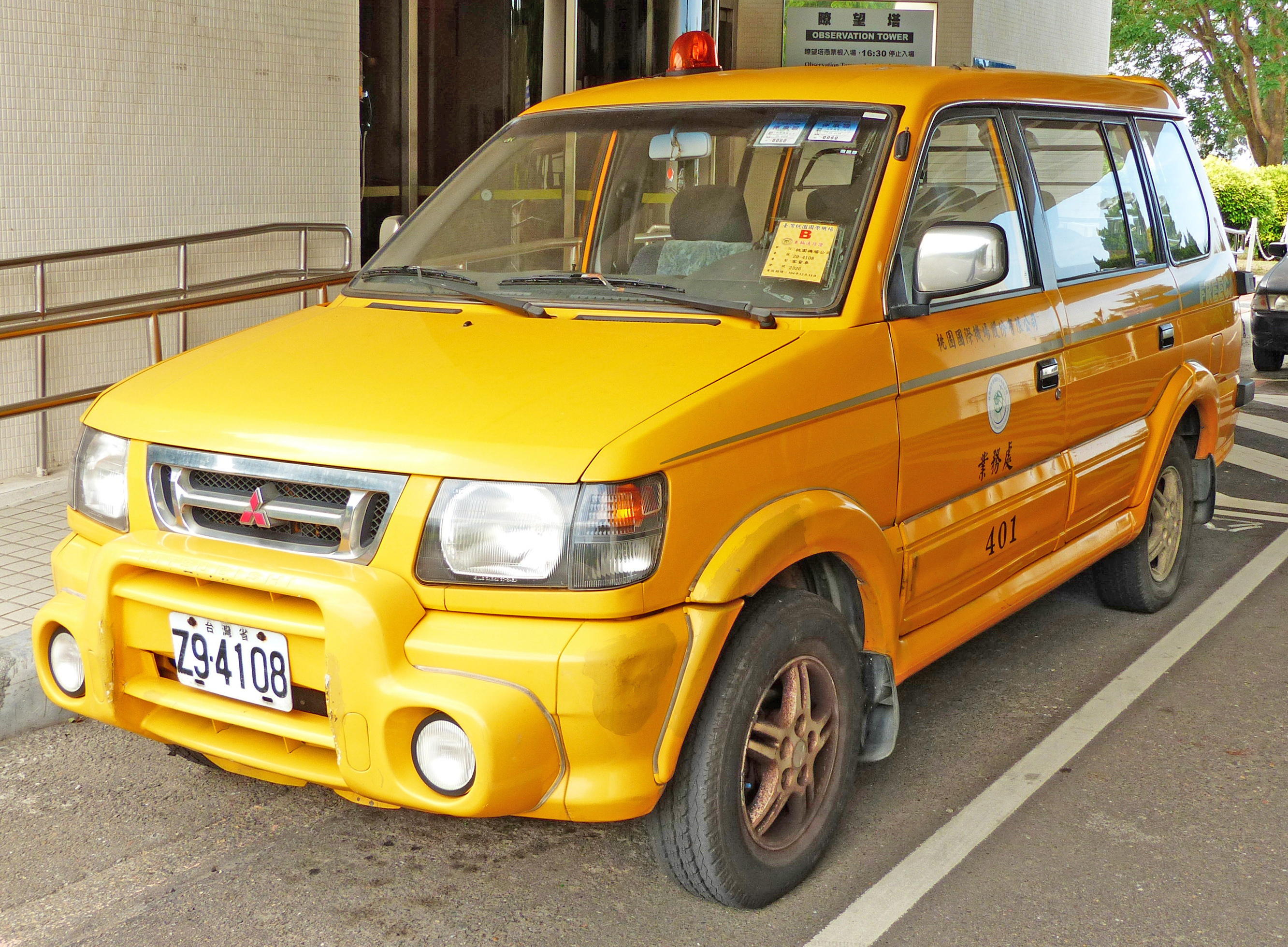
Mitsubishi Freeca Royal Exceed (pre-facelift, Taiwan)

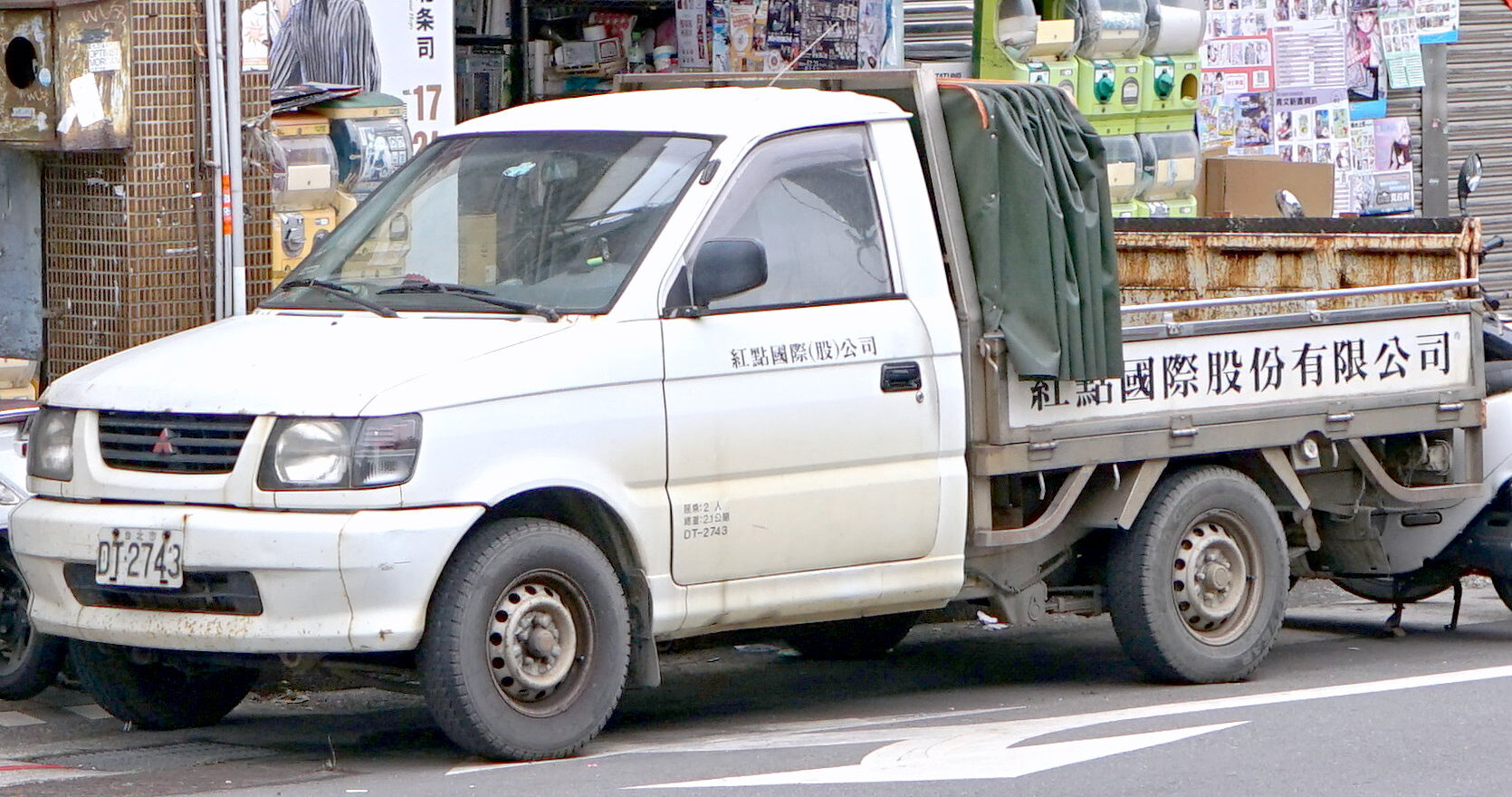
Mitsubishi Freeca pickup (pre-facelift, Taiwan)

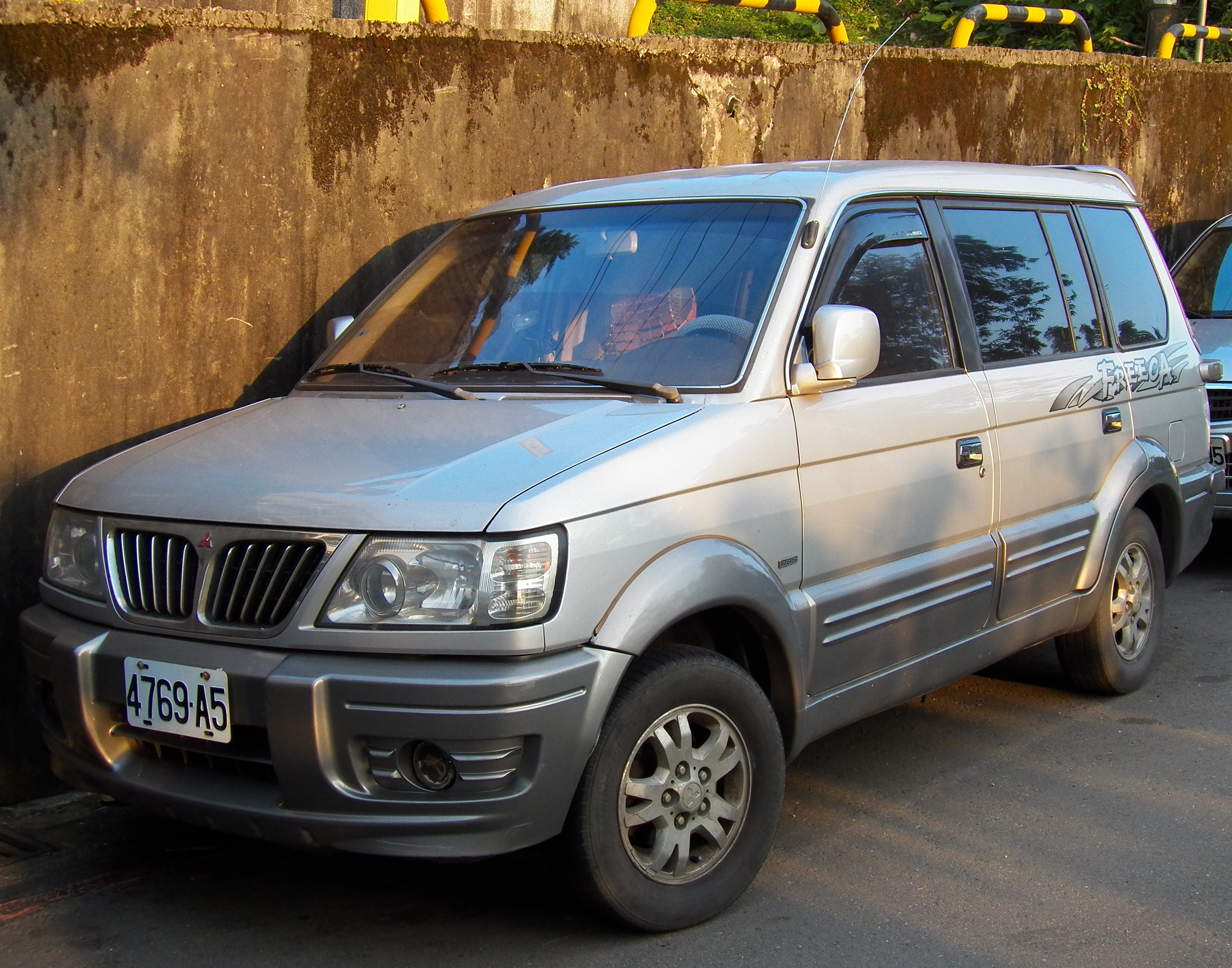
Mitsubishi Freeca Royal Exceed (first facelift, Taiwan)

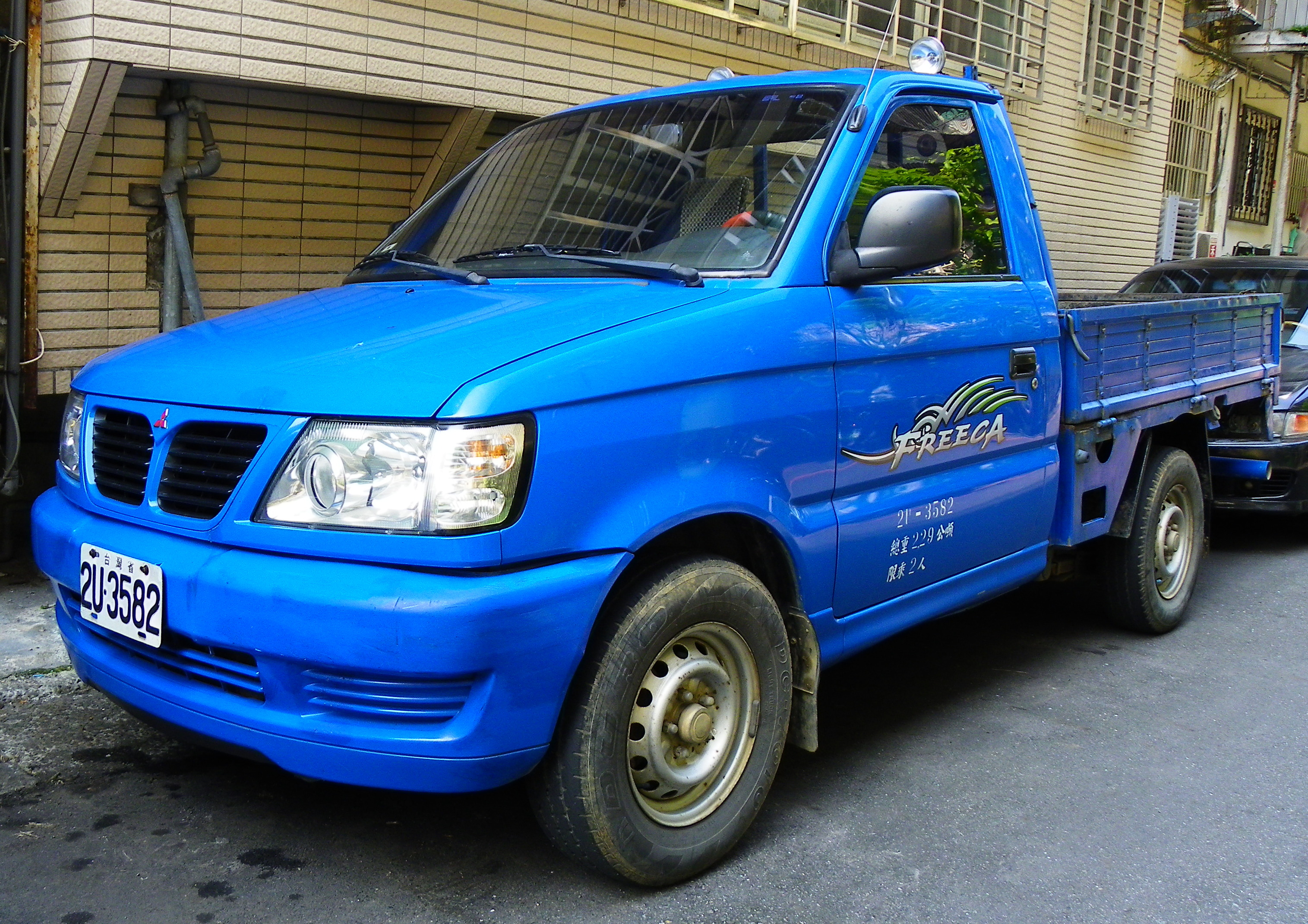
Mitsubishi Freeca pickup (first facelift, Taiwan)

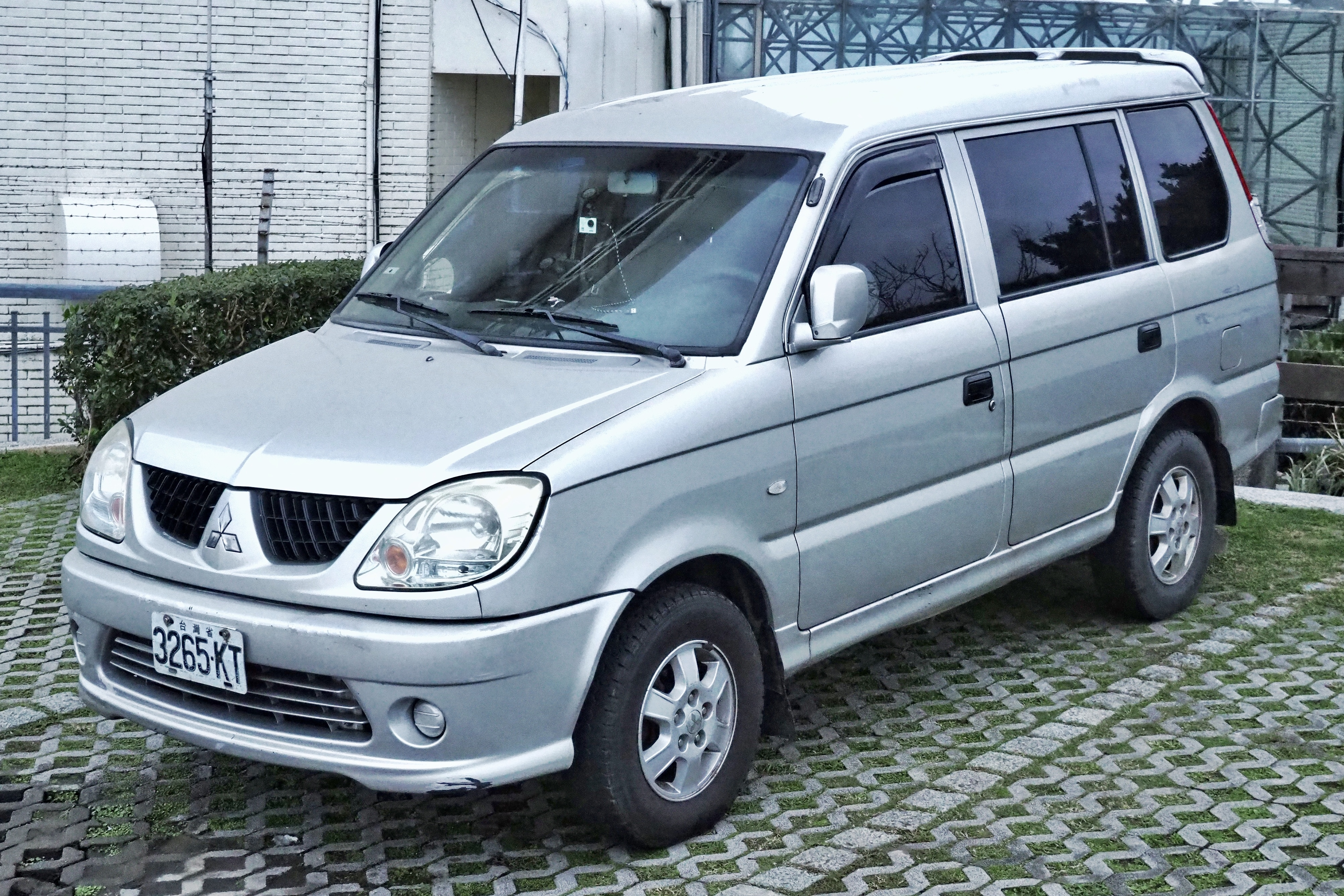
Mitsubishi Freeca GLS (second facelift, Taiwan)

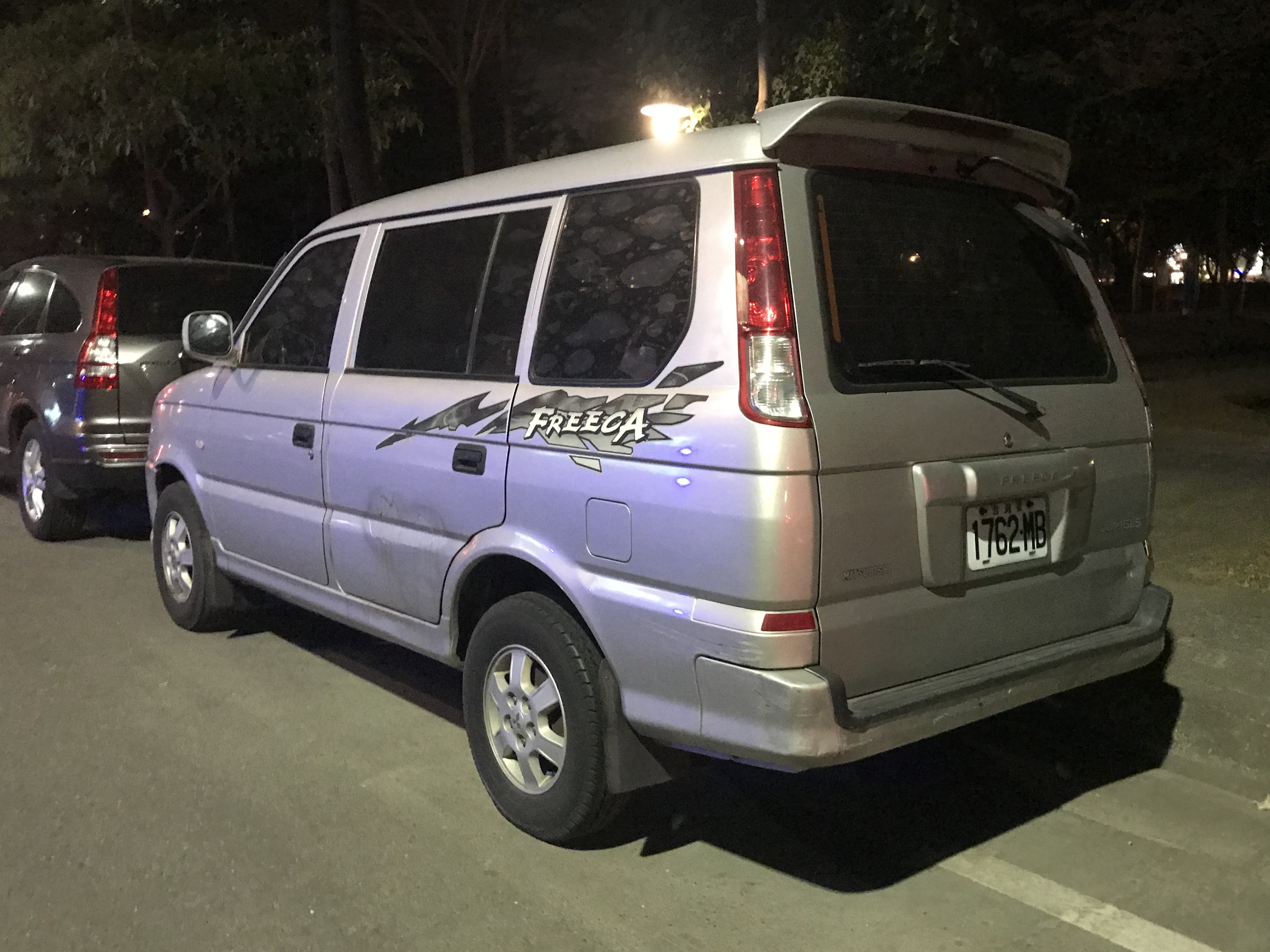
Mitsubishi Freeca GLS (second facelift, Taiwan)

Mitsubishi Adventure

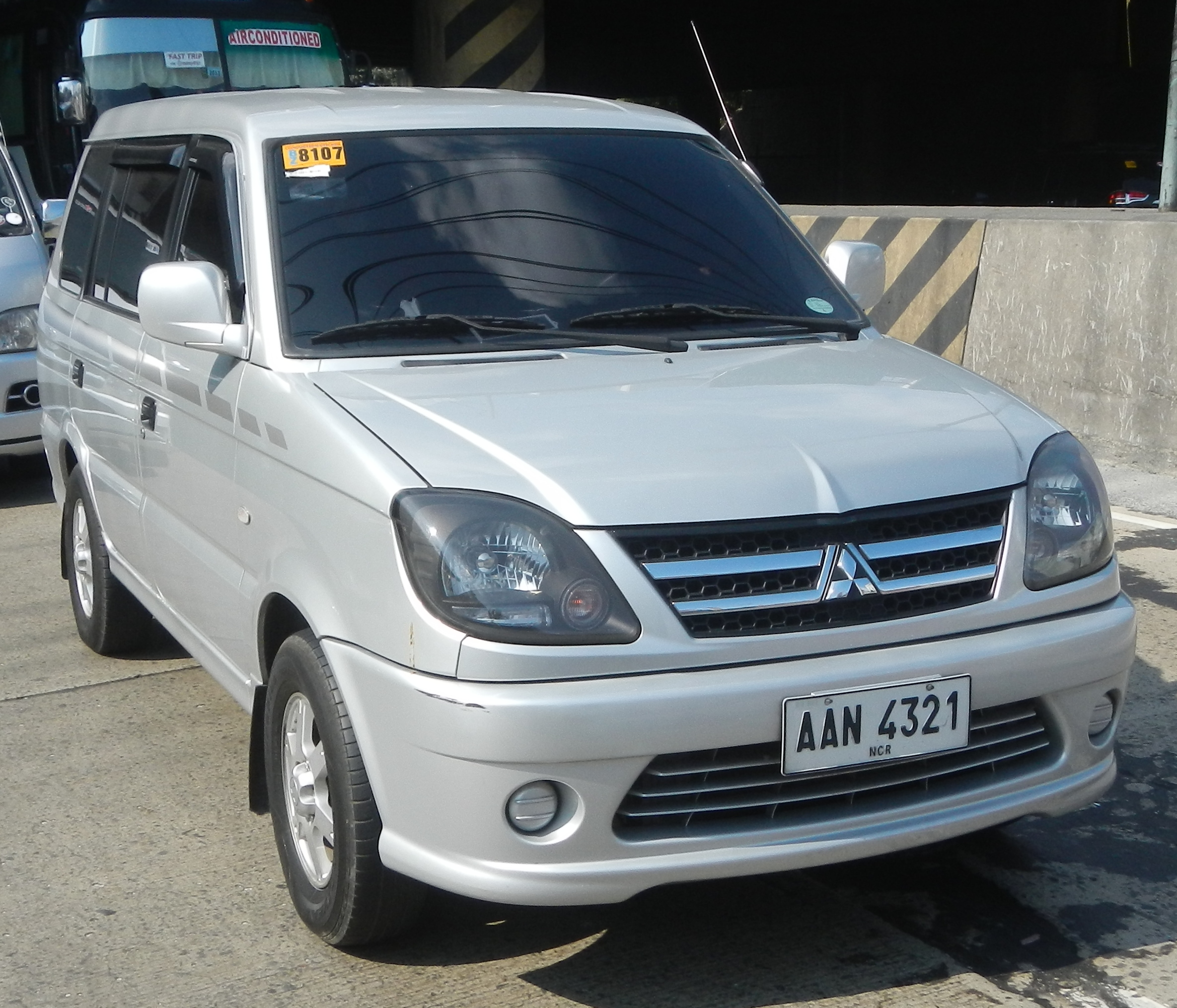
2014 Mitsubishi Adventure GLX (third facelift, Philippines)

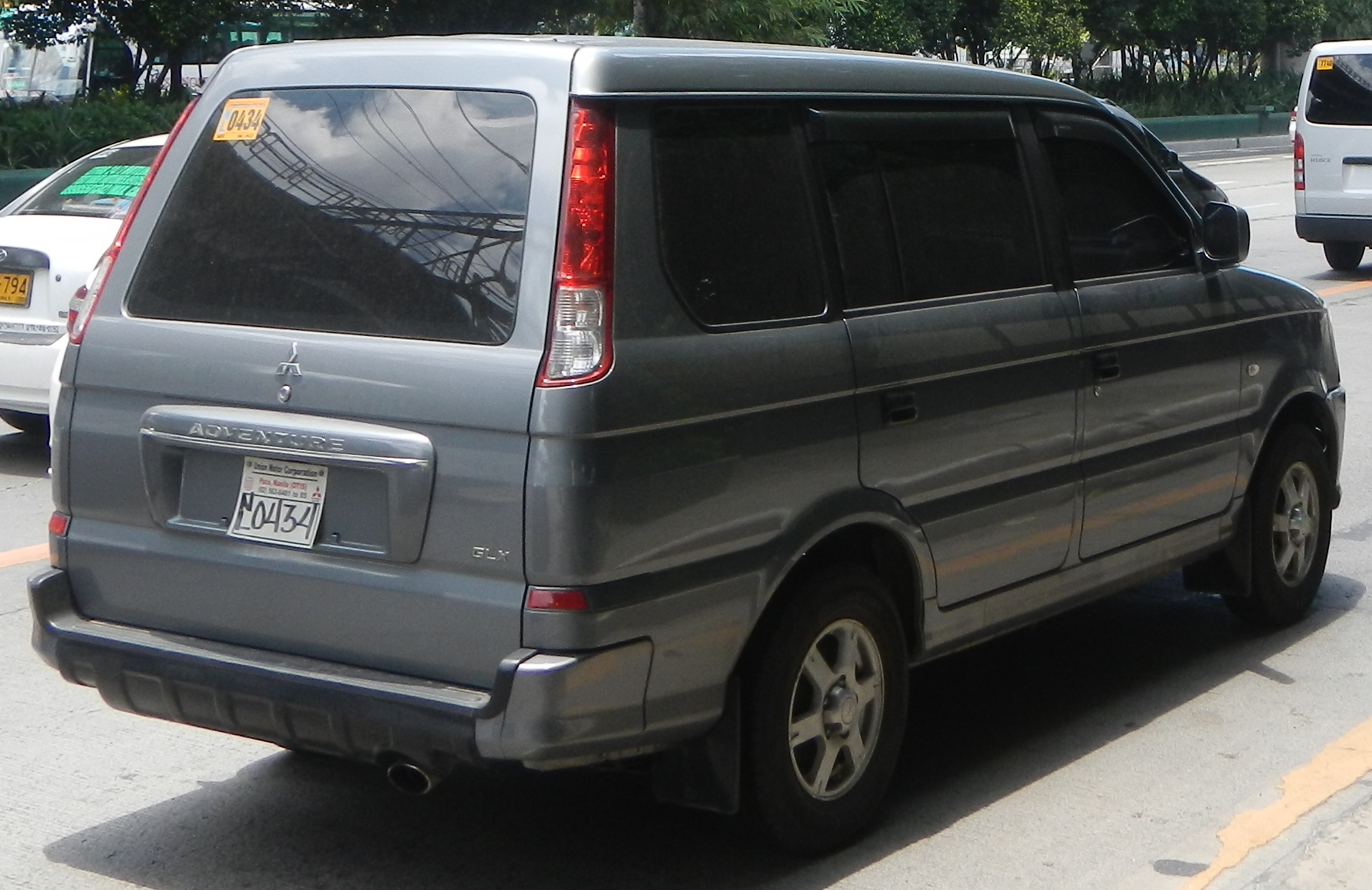
2016 Mitsubishi Adventure GLX (third facelift, Philippines)

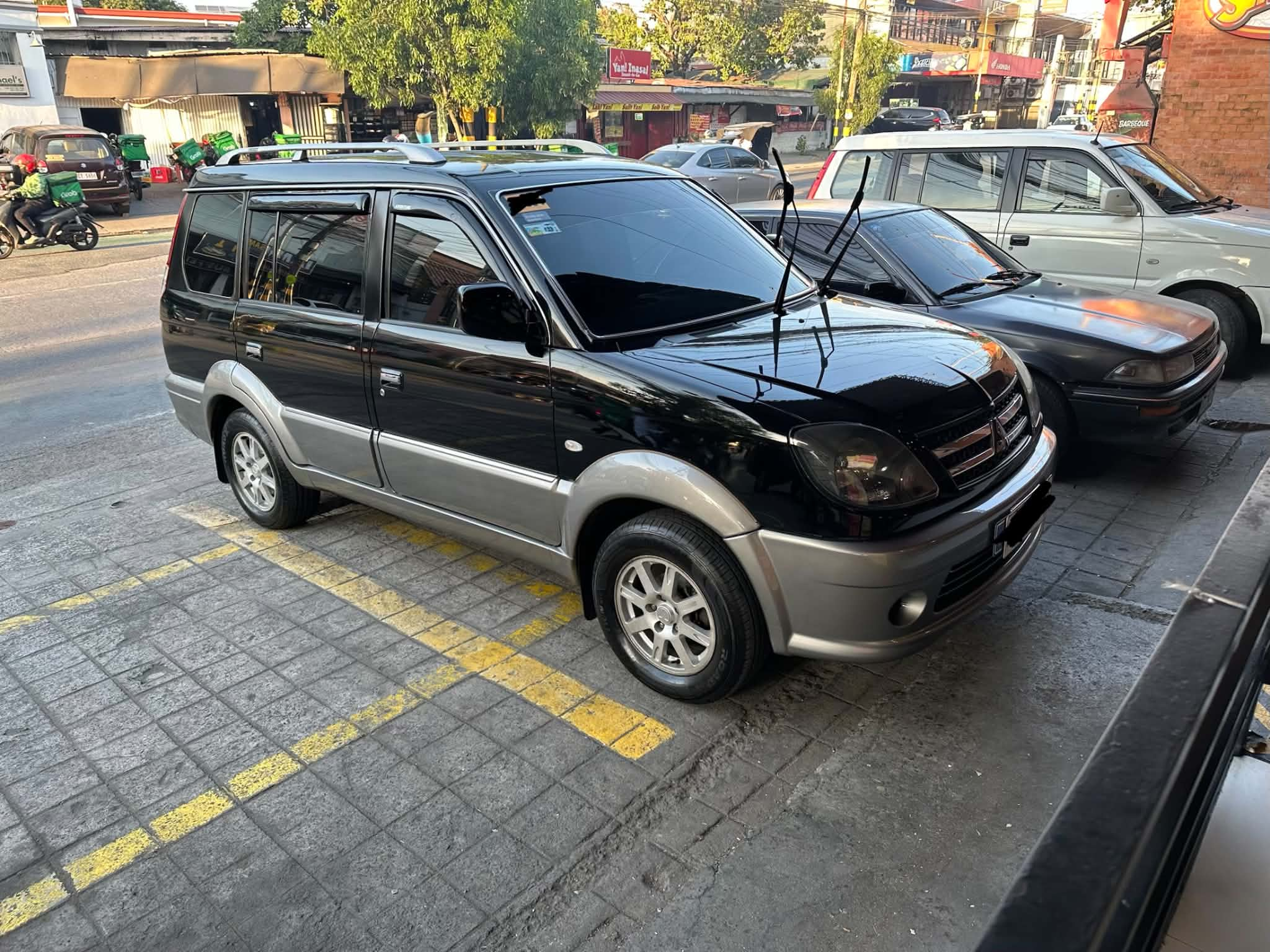
2016 Mitsubishi Adventure Super Sport MT (third facelift, Philippines)

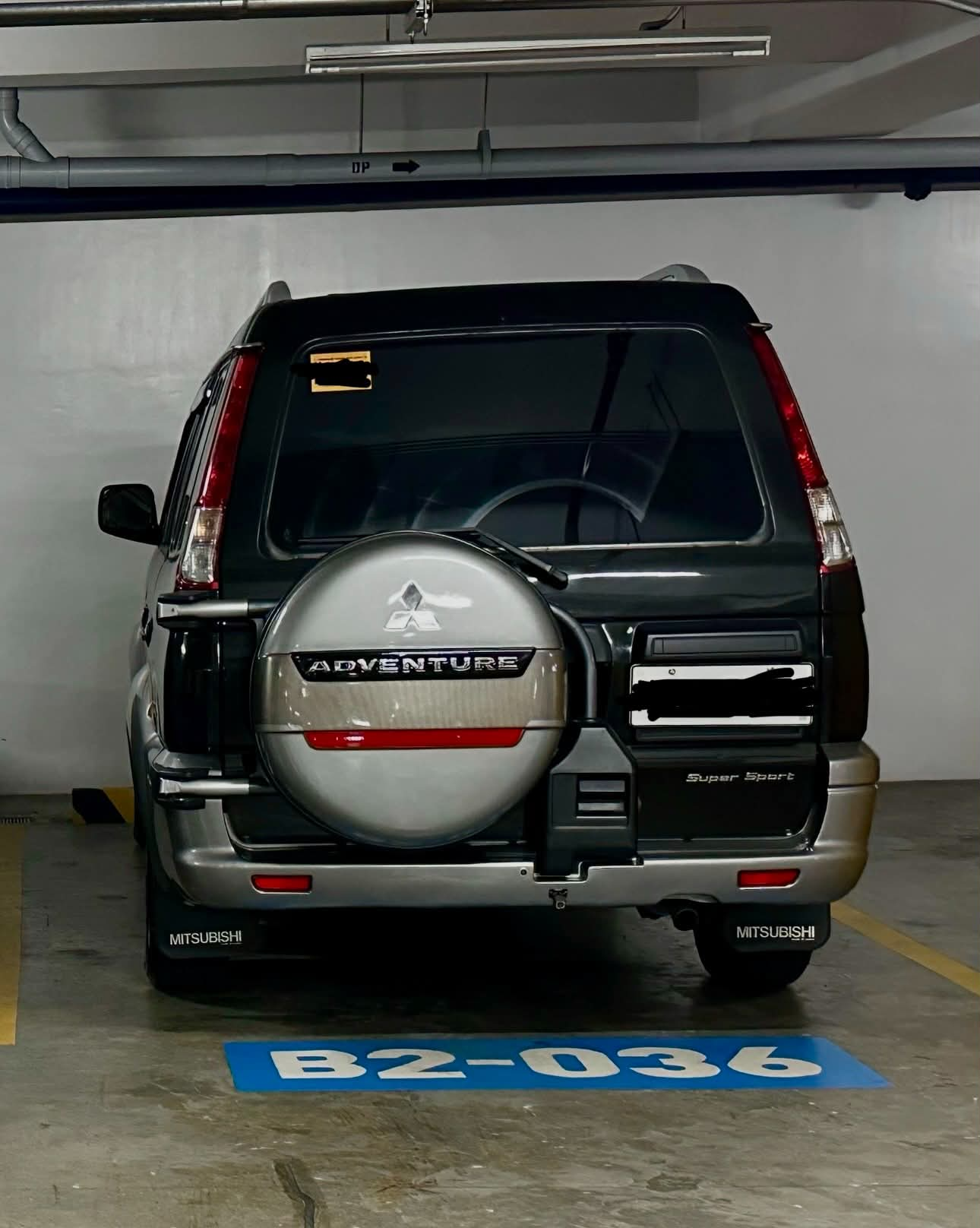
2016 Mitsubishi Adventure Super Sport MT rear view (third facelift, Philippines)

Mitsubishi Kuda

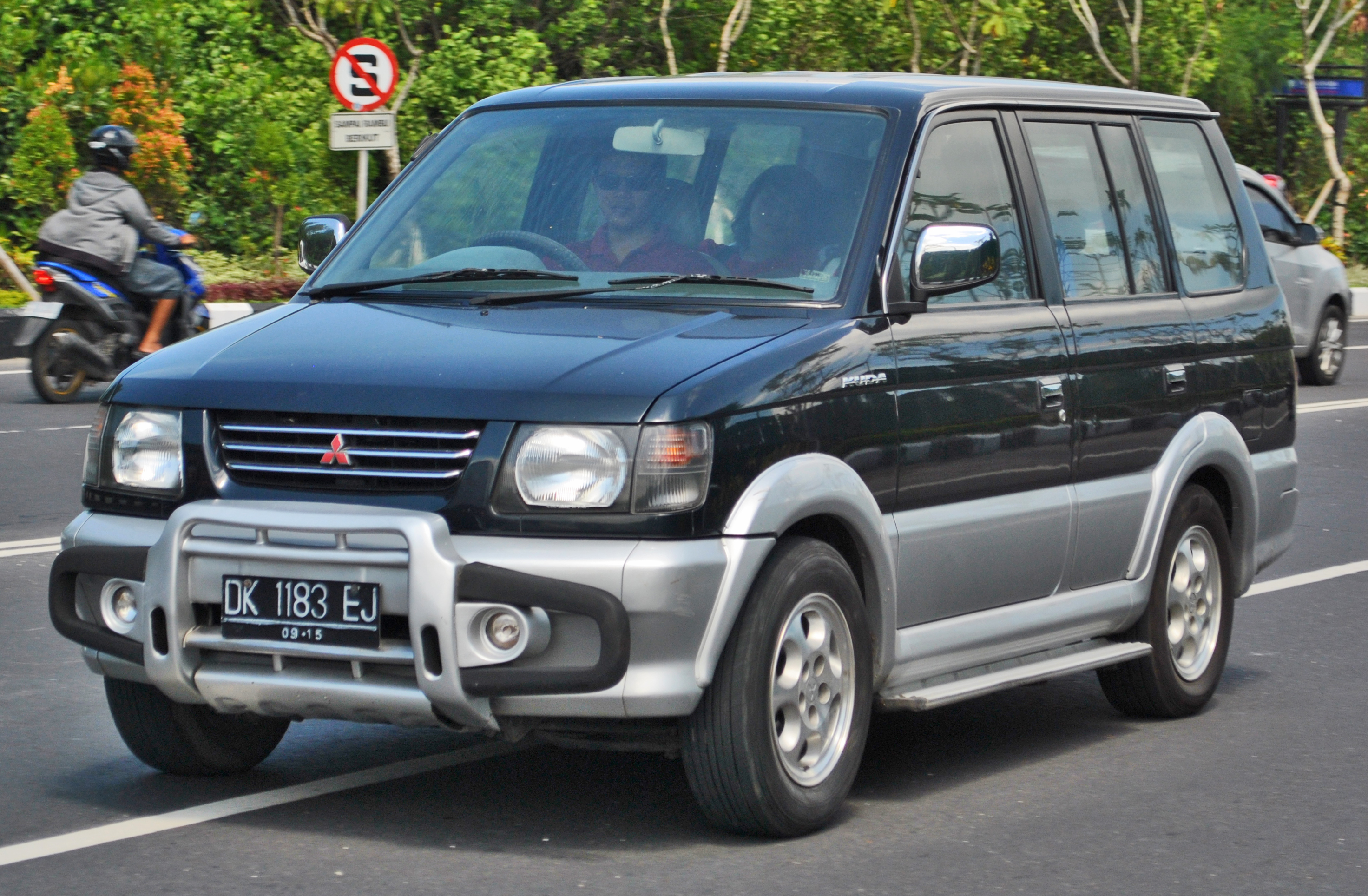
Mitsubishi Kuda Super Exceed 1.6 (VA1W; pre-facelift, Indonesia)

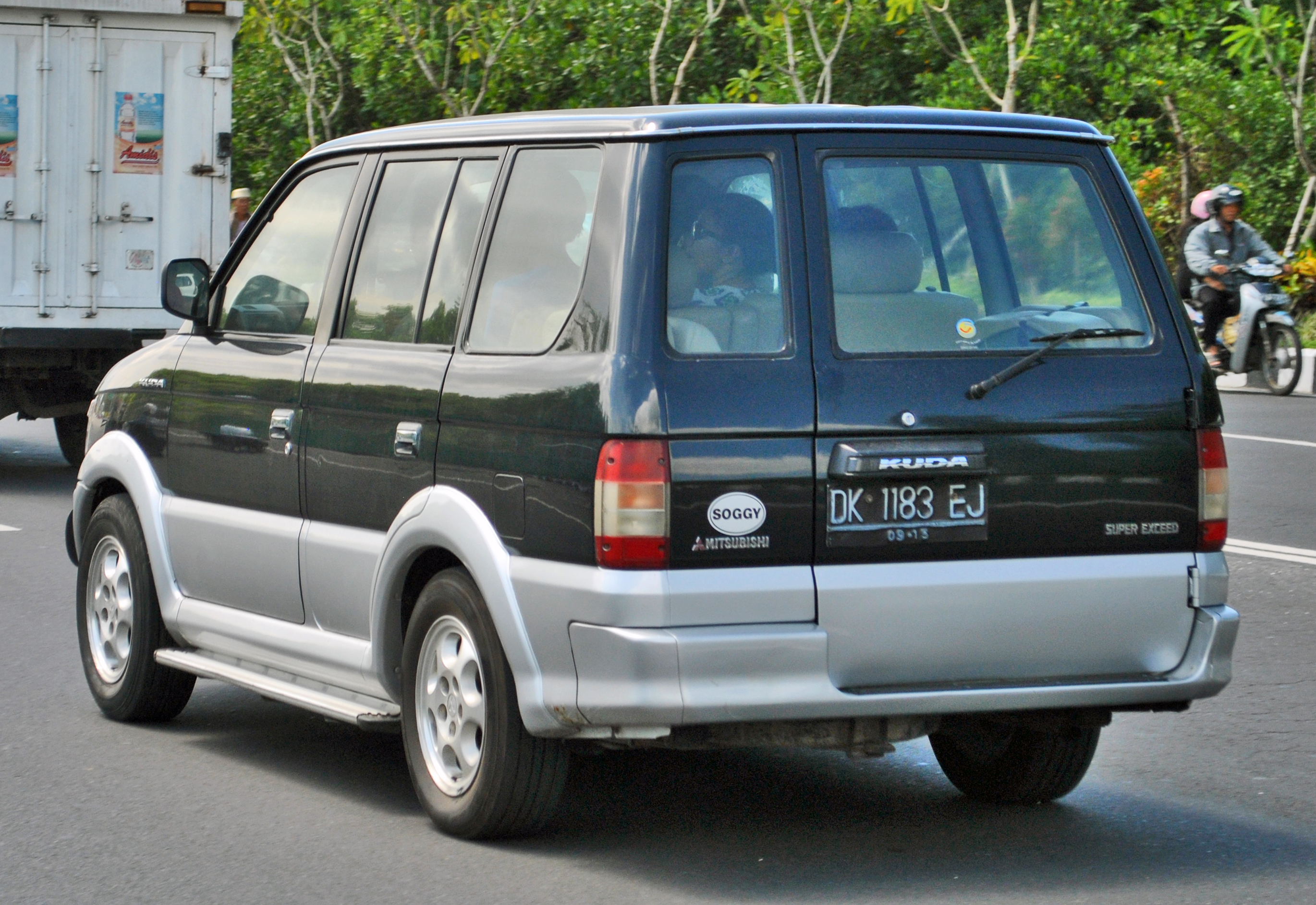
Mitsubishi Kuda Super Exceed 1.6 (VA1W; pre-facelift, Indonesia)

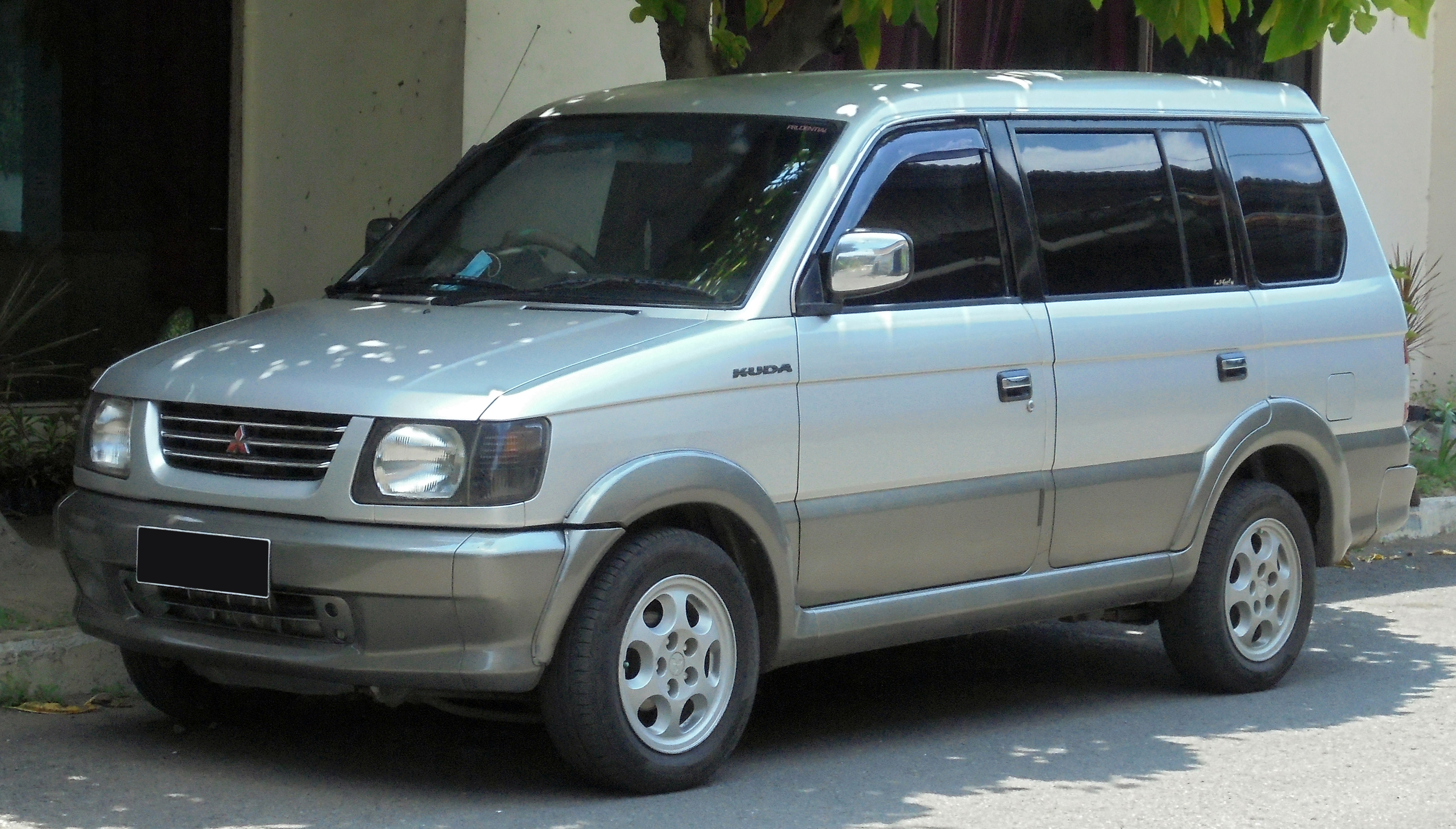
Mitsubishi Kuda Super Exceed 2.5 Diesel (VB5W; pre-facelift, Indonesia)

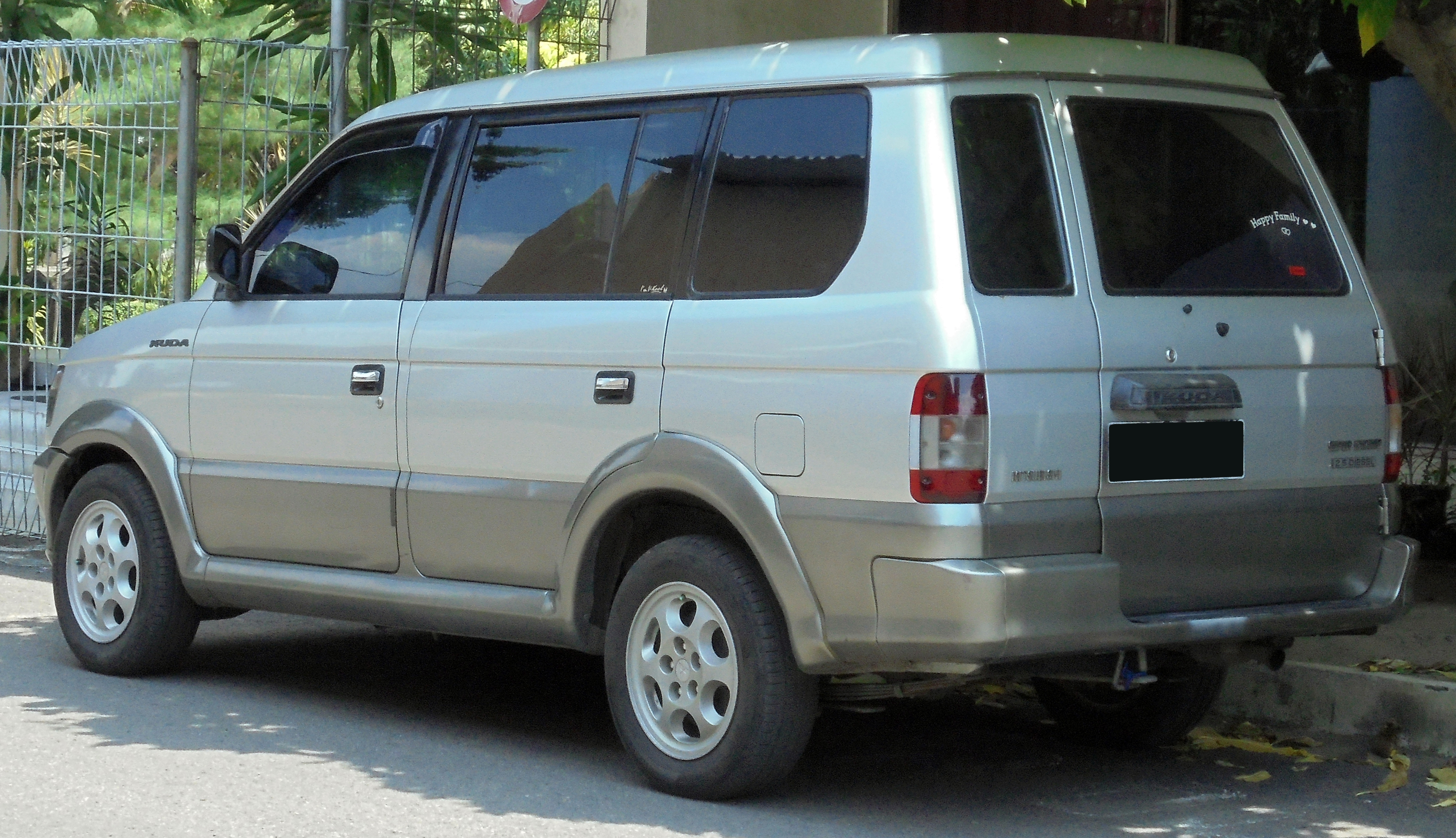
Mitsubishi Kuda Super Exceed 2.5 Diesel (VB5W; pre-facelift, Indonesia)

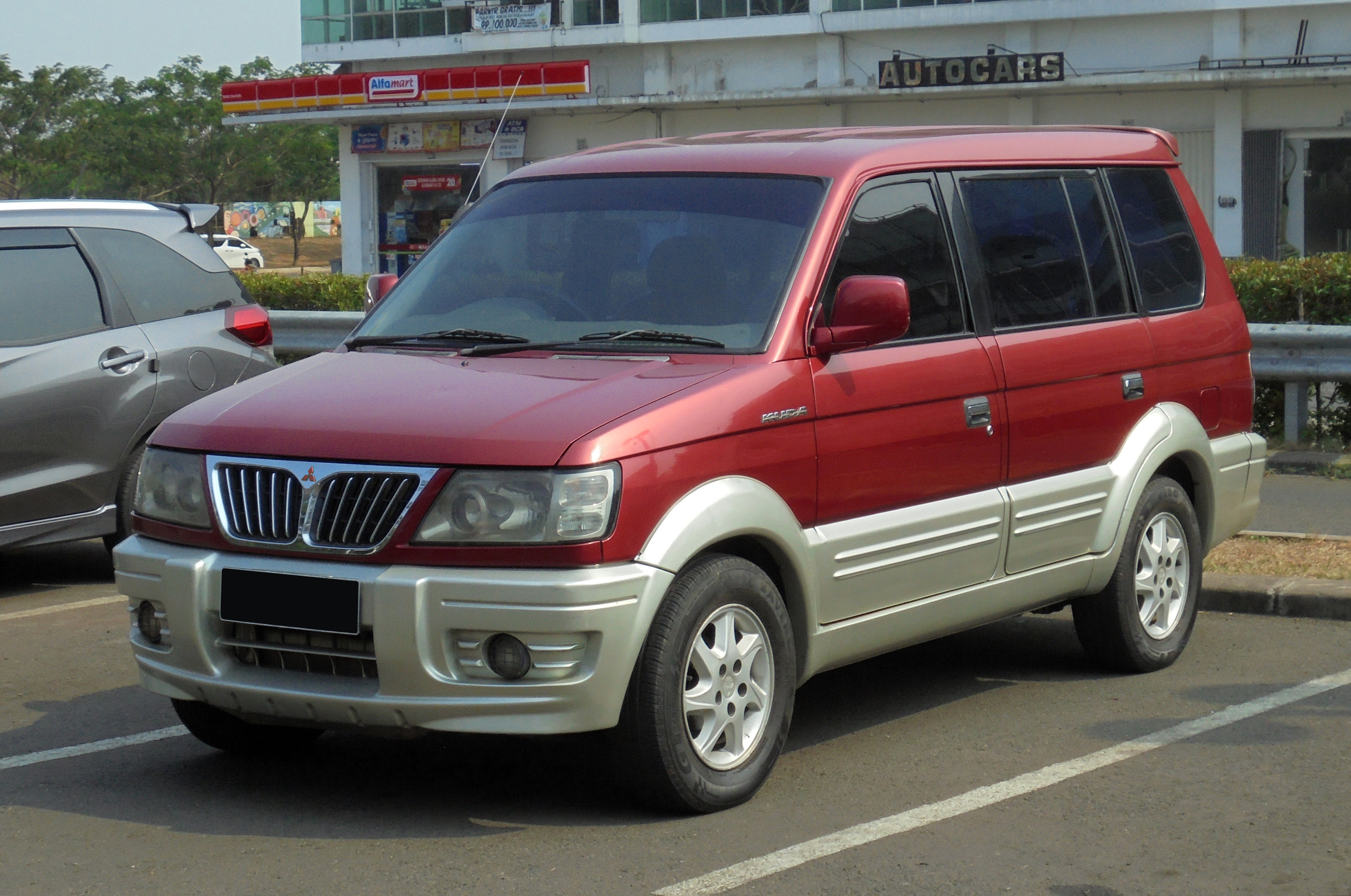
Mitsubishi Kuda Grandia 2.0 MPi (VB2W; first facelift, Indonesia)

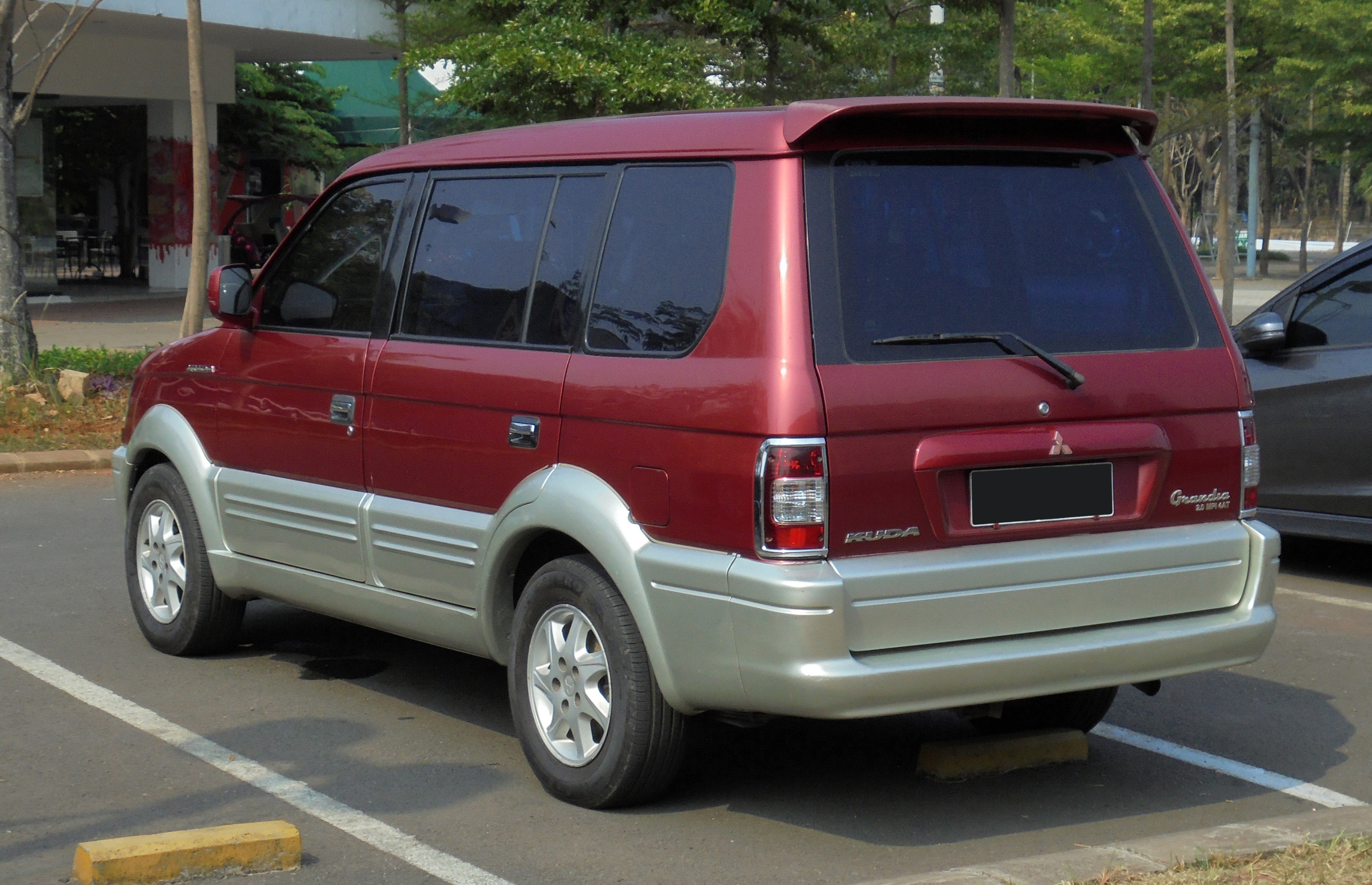
Mitsubishi Kuda Grandia 2.0 MPi (VB2W; first facelift, Indonesia)

Soueast Freeca

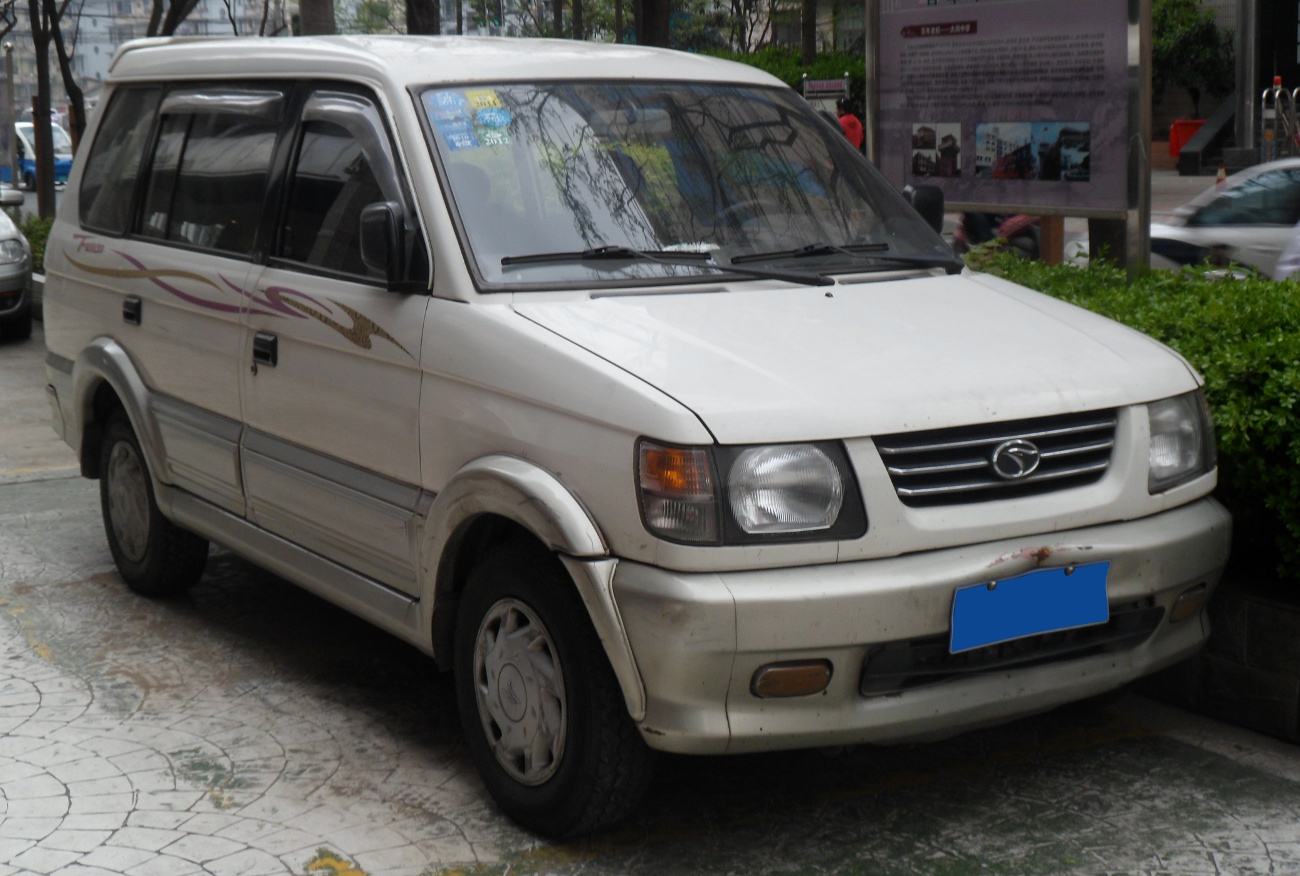
Soueast Freeca DN6440-IM (pre-facelift, China)

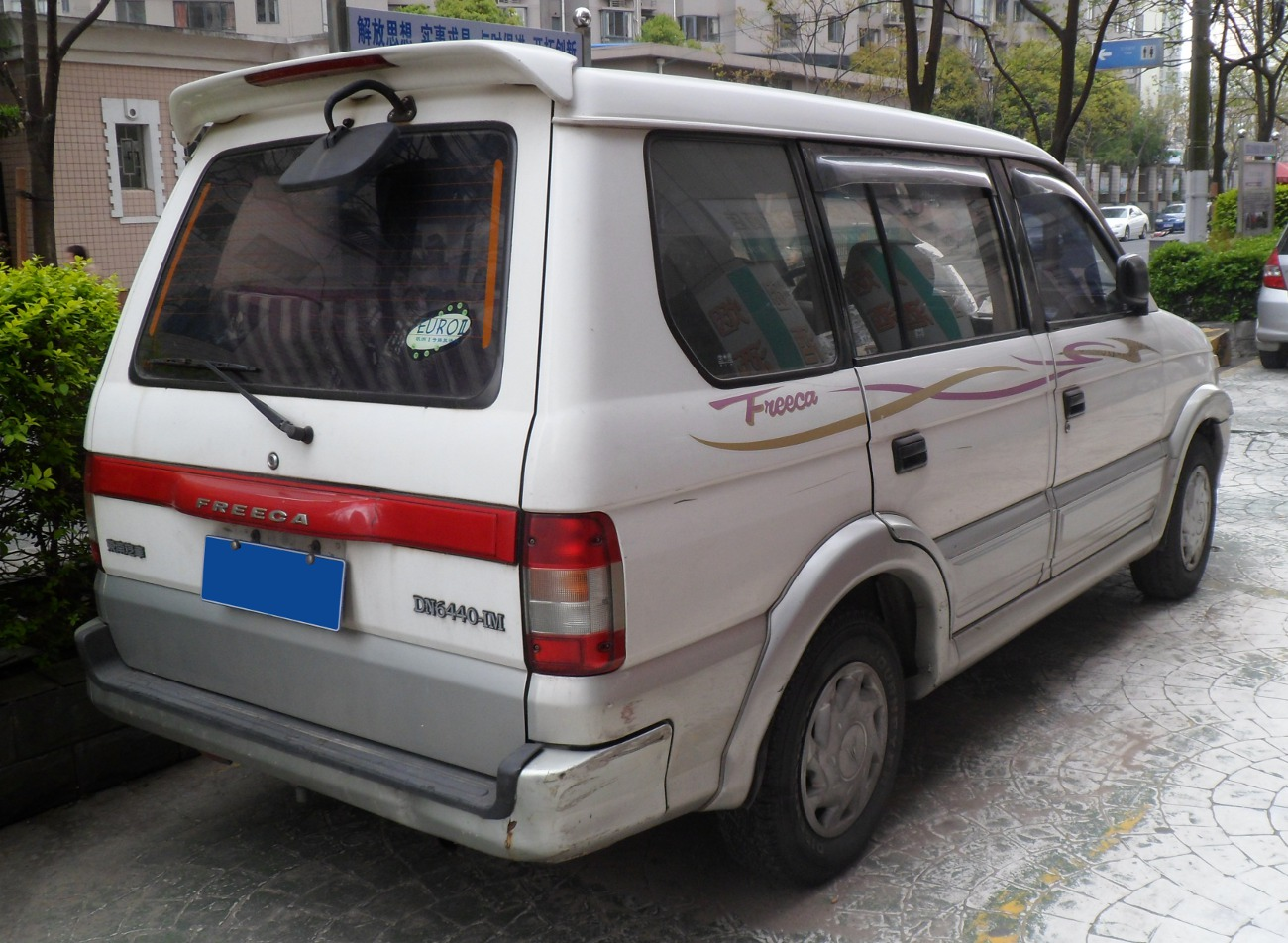
Soueast Freeca DN6440-IM (pre-facelift, China)

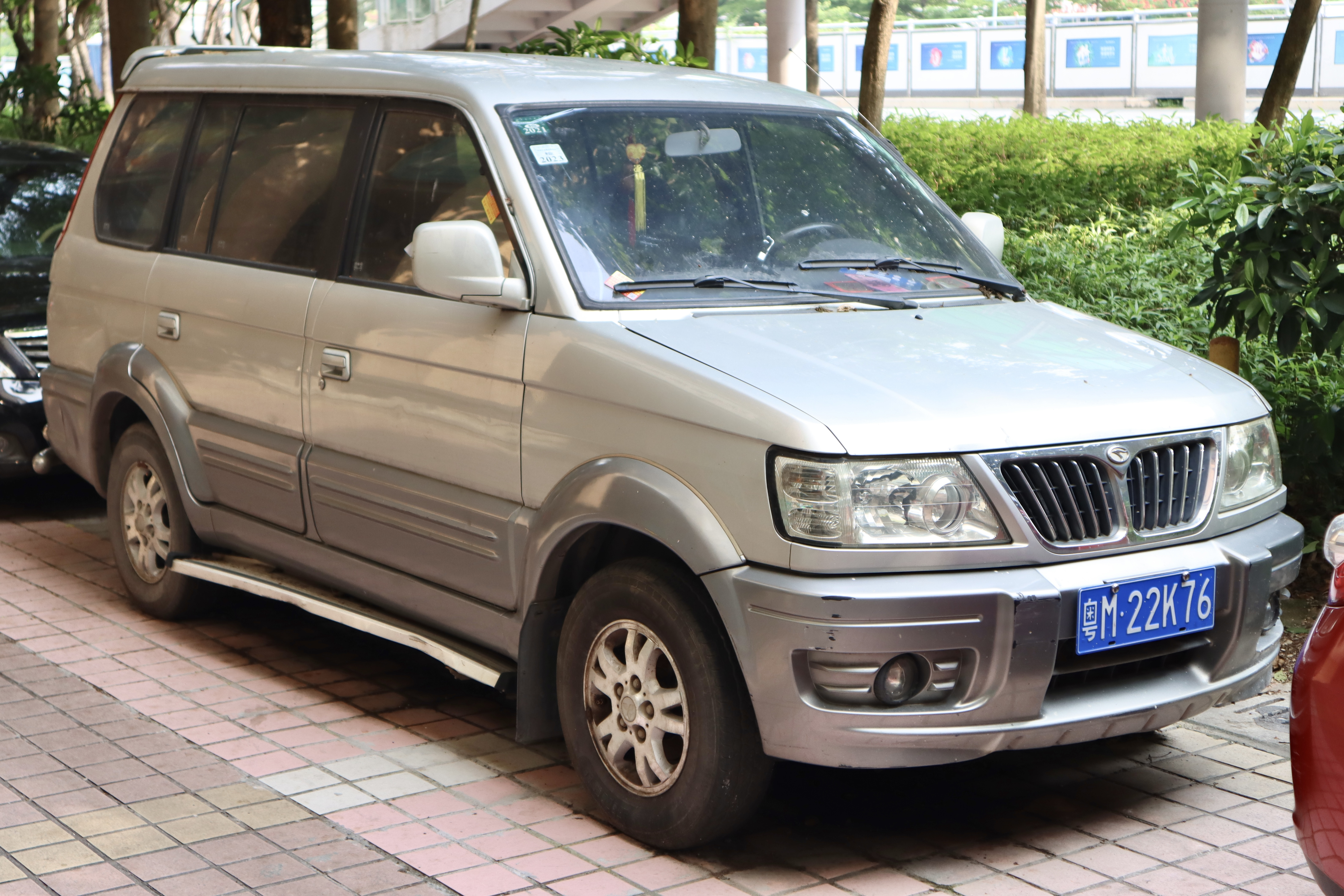
Soueast Freeca (first facelift, China)

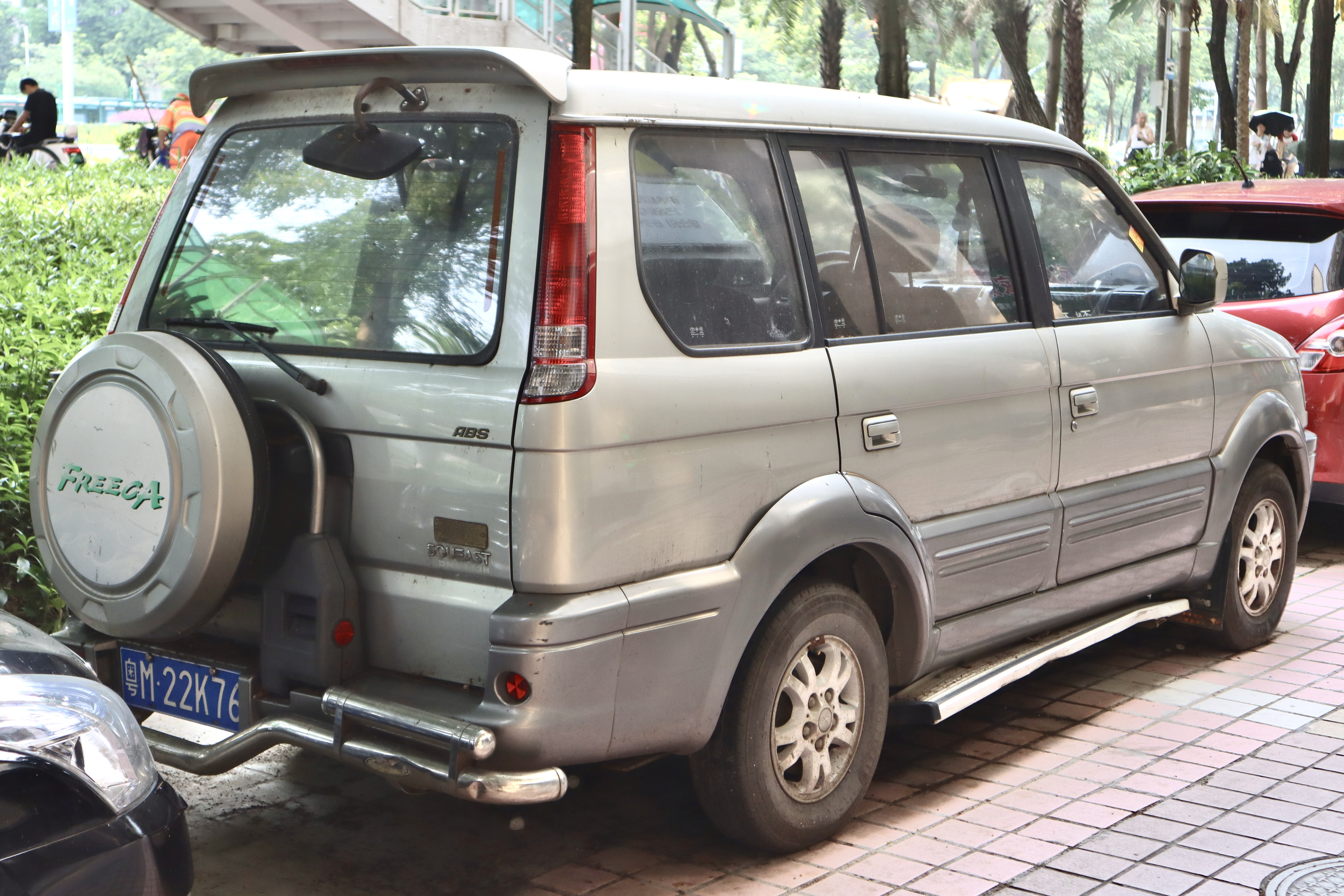
Soueast Freeca (first facelift, China)

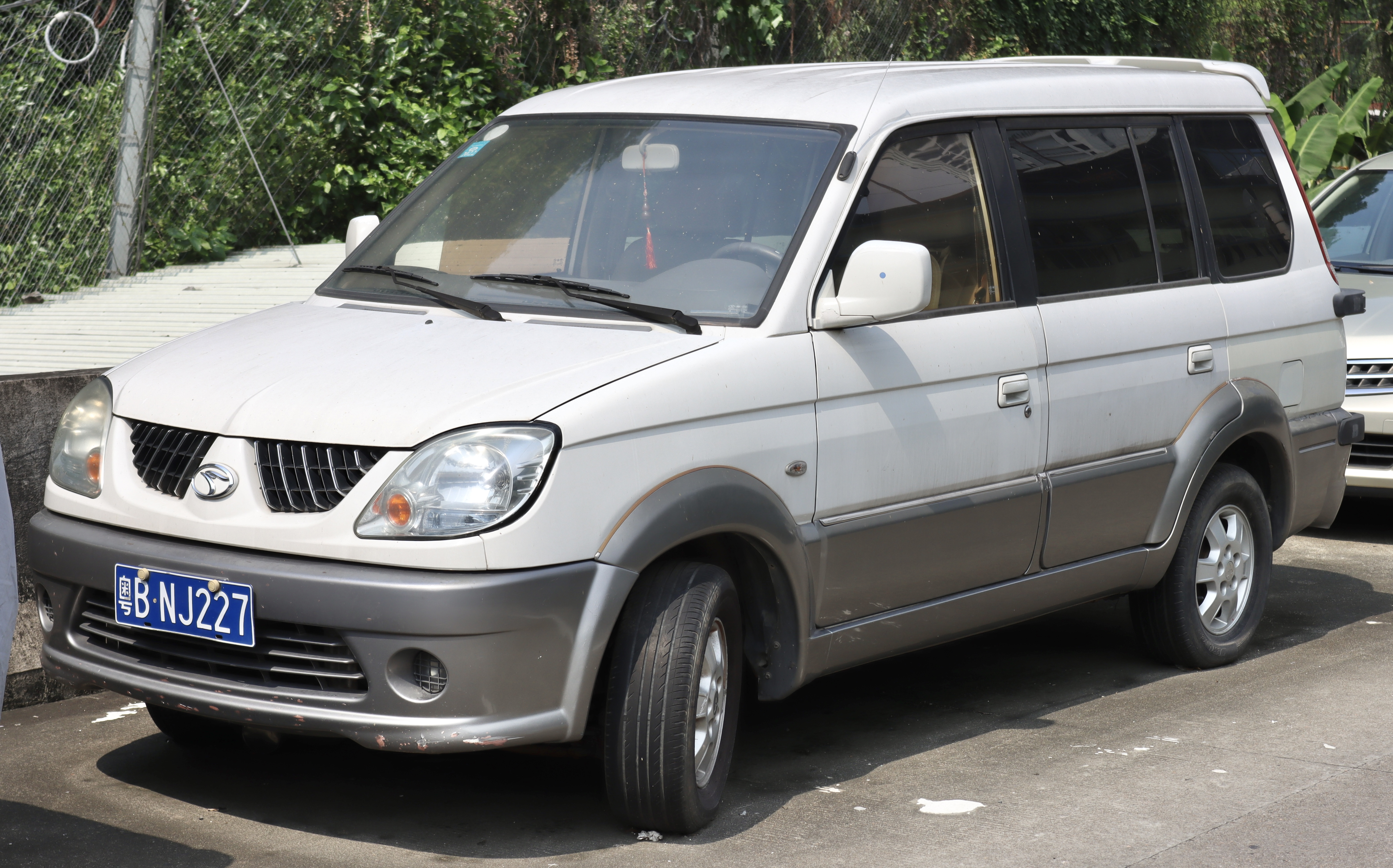
Soueast Freeca (second facelift, China)

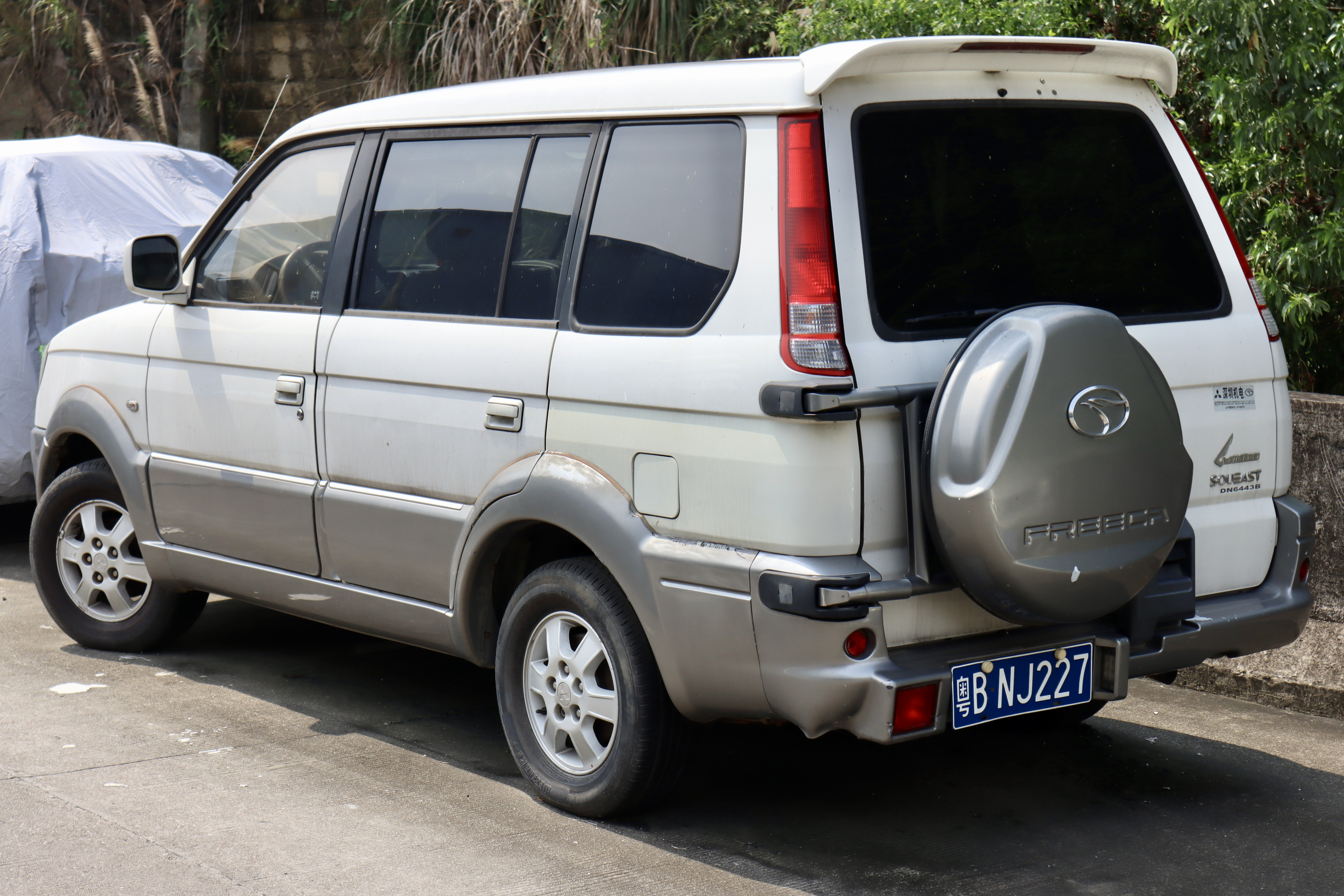
Soueast Freeca (second facelift, China)

== Production ==
Year	Taiwan (Freeca)	Philippines (Adventure)	Indonesia (Kuda)	China (Freeca)
1997–99	Figures unavailable			
2000	17,044	6,729	20,916	1,050
2001	13,531	7,714	4,776	7,350
2002	12,537	7,742	9,669	8,970
2003	11,800	3,921	7,350	12,630
2004	11,359	5,868	5,670	7,458
2005	12,479*	5,876	825	4,163
2006	4,791*	4,560	-	1,911
2007	6,682*	6,033	-	1,650
2008	2,133*	4,570	-	721

* Freeca and Zinger combined production figures

(Sources: Facts & Figures 2000, Facts & Figures 2005, Facts & Figures 2009, Mitsubishi Motors Corporation)
