= Mitsubishi Galant =

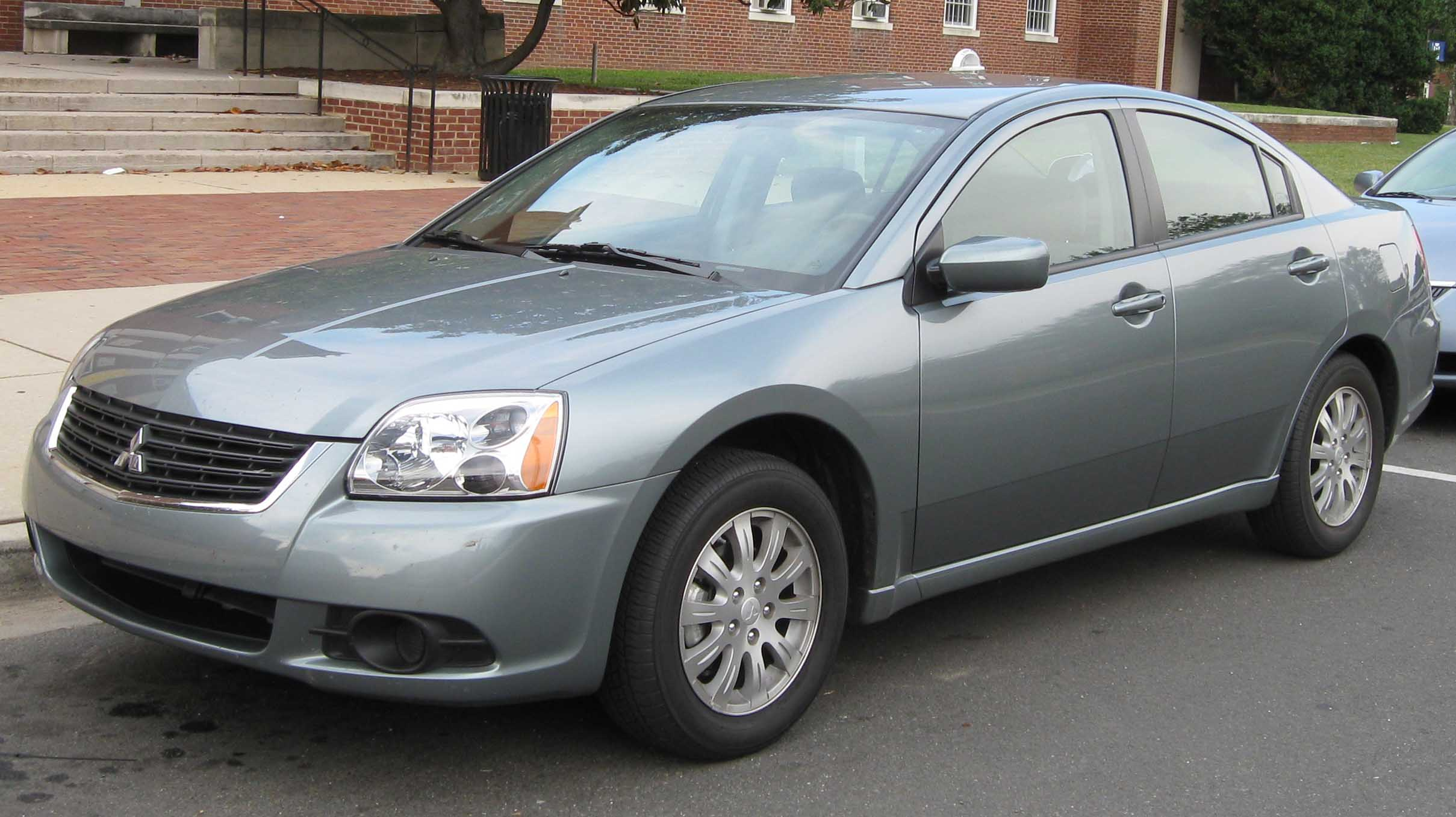
- 2009 Mitsubishi Galant

Overview
- Manufacturer: Mitsubishi Motors
- Production: 1969–2012
- Assembly: Japan: Okazaki (Nagoya Plant: 1969–2006); Australia: Port Melbourne (1971–1972); Australia: Tonsley Park (MMAL: 1972–2008); United States: Normal, Illinois (Diamond-Star Motors/MMNA: 1993–2012); Indonesia: Jakarta (1977–2005); New Zealand: Petone (Todd Motors: 1972–1975); New Zealand: Porirua (MMNZ: 1975–1998); Philippines: Cainta (MMPC: 1973–2006); Thailand: Laem Chabang (MMTh: 1992–1998); China: Fuzhou (Soueast Motors); Malaysia: Pekan, Pahang (AMM: 1987–1994)

Body and chassis
- Class: Compact car (1969–1987); Mid-size car (1983–2012)
- Layout: Longitudinal front-engine, rear-wheel-drive (1969–1987); Transverse front-engine, front-wheel-drive (1983–2012); Transverse front-engine, four-wheel-drive (1987–2006)

Chronology
- Predecessor: Mitsubishi Colt 1500

The Mitsubishi Galant (Japanese: 三菱・ギャラン, Mitsubishi Gyaran) is an automobile which was produced by Japanese manufacturer Mitsubishi from 1969 until 2012. The model name was derived from the French word galant, meaning "chivalrous". There have been nine distinct generations with total cumulative sales exceeding five million units. It began as a compact sedan, but over the course of its life evolved into a mid-size car. Initial production was based in Japan, with manufacturing later moved to other countries.

== First generation (A50; 1969) ==
First generation
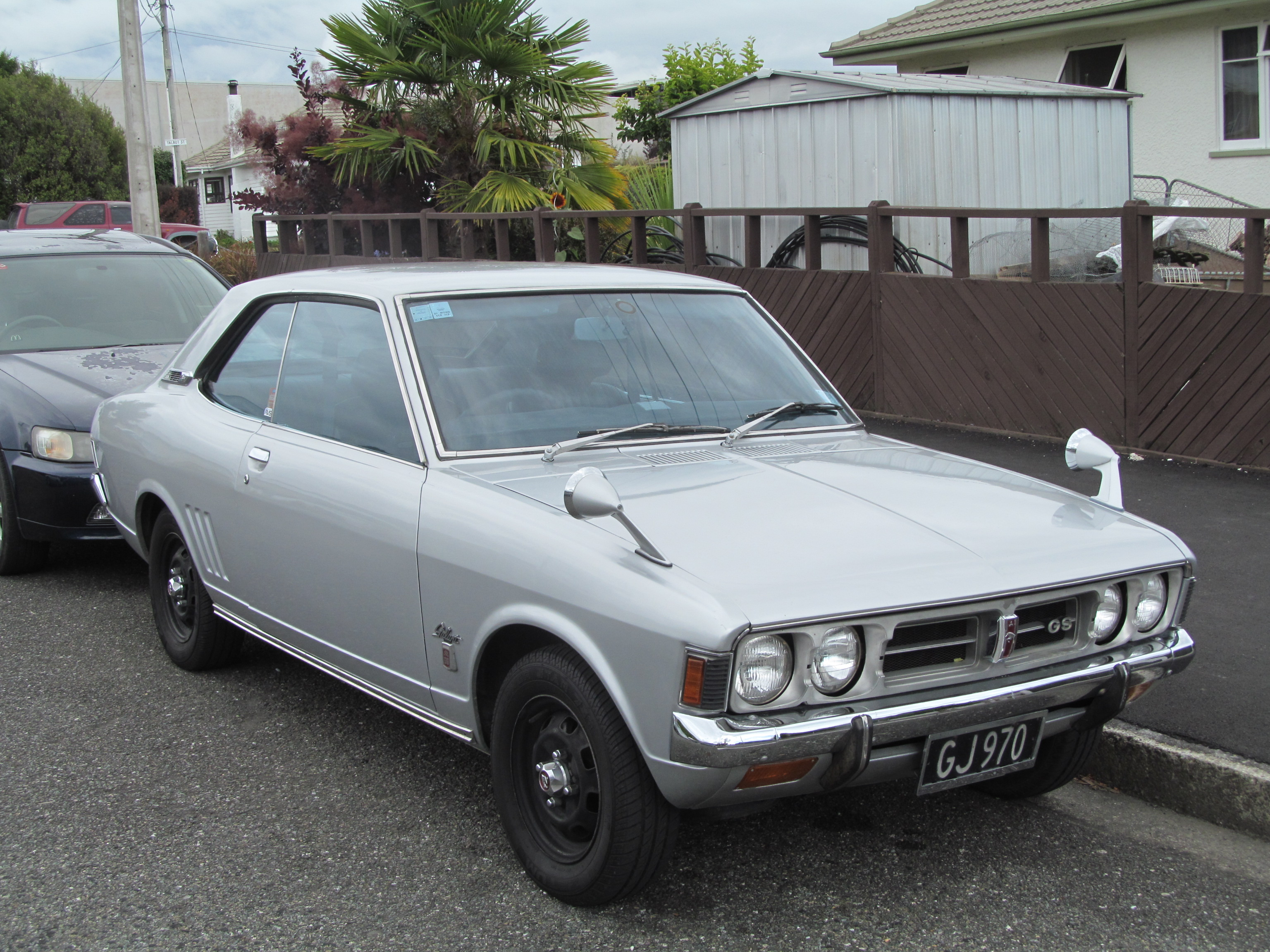

Overview
- Also called: Chrysler Valiant Galant; Colt Galant; Dodge Colt; Mitsubishi Colt Galant lonsdale YD41 Lonsdale
- Production: 1969–1973
- Designer: Shinichi Mitsuhashi

Body and chassis
- Class: Compact car
- Body style: 2-door hardtop coupé 4-door sedan 5-door station wagon
- Layout: Front-engine, rear-wheel-drive
- Related: Mitsubishi Galant GTO; Mitsubishi Galant FTO

Powertrain
- Engine: 1.3 L 4G30 I4 (A51); 1.4 L 4G33 I4 (A54); 1.5 L 4G31 I4 (A52); 1.6 L 4G32 I4 (A53); 1.7 L 4G35 I4 (A55)

Dimensions
- Wheelbase: 2,420 mm (95.3 in)
- Length: 4,080 mm (160.6 in)
- Width: 1,560 mm (61.4 in)
- Height: 1,370 mm (53.9 in)

The first generation of the car, initially known as the Colt Galant, was released in December 1969 at a new Mitsubishi Japanese dealership called Galant Shop. The design was dubbed "Dynawedge" by Mitsubishi, referring to the influence of aerodynamics on the silhouette. Three models were available, powered by the new 'Saturn' engine in 1.3- (AI model) or 1.5-liter (AII and AIII) configurations. 1.4- and 1.6-liter versions (14L and 16L) replaced these in September 1971. A larger 115 PS (85 kW) 1.7-liter arrived for the top GS model in January 1973. Initially only available as a four-door sedan, five-door estate and two-door hardtop (A53) variants were added in 1970. The hardtop was Mitsubishi's first production passenger car with full side windows and no side pillars. In March 1973, with only two months of production left, the cleaner "MCA-II" version of the 1.6 arrived. With 97 PS (71 kW) it was three horsepower down on the regular version.

The Galant was offered as a competitor to the Toyota Corona, Nissan Bluebird, Honda Accord, and Mazda Capella. It became Mitsubishi's first car to be sold in the United States in 1971 when the Chrysler Corporation, the company's new partner and stakeholder, began importing the car as the Dodge Colt, as their answer to new American subcompacts, the Ford Pinto, the Chevrolet Vega, and the AMC Gremlin. It was also produced by Chrysler Australia and sold alongside the larger Chrysler Valiant models as the Chrysler Valiant Galant. In South Africa, the A53 Colt Galant arrived in late 1972 as the Dodge Colt 1600 GS (AY series). The car had already been rallied there, in 1300 and 1600 forms, and only the Hardtop GS version was sold to capitalize on the car's sporty image. Gross power claimed was 97 PS (71 kW) at 6700 rpm and the car was fitted with Rostyle wheels as also used on locally assembled Hillman Vogues.

From 1970, a fastback coupé model was developed, the Galant GTO. Fashioned after contemporary American muscle cars, the hardtop GTO was available with a choice of two "Saturn" engines and the 2-litre Astron 80, and was available until 1975. The nameplate was sufficiently highly regarded in Japan for it to be resurrected for the 1990 Mitsubishi GTO coupé.

A third, more compact coupé was introduced on a chassis shortened by 12 cm in 1971, the Galant FTO. Powered by the 4G41 1.4 L engine, it too would leave a legacy for the company to return to in the 1990s with the Mitsubishi FTO.

=== New Zealand ===
Although the earlier Colt had been imported in limited numbers, this generation, in 1.6-litre coupé form only, was the first model to establish the Mitsubishi brand in New Zealand from 1971 when newly appointed distributor Todd Motors, which also imported and assembled Chrysler and Hillman, started selling a small number of Japanese-assembled cars to supplement its mainstream Hillman Avenger and Hunter models.

The coupé was assembled in New Zealand from 1972, firstly at Todd's Petone factory, on the Avenger/Hunter line and, from 1974, at the brand-new purpose-built factory in Porirua (closed in 1998).

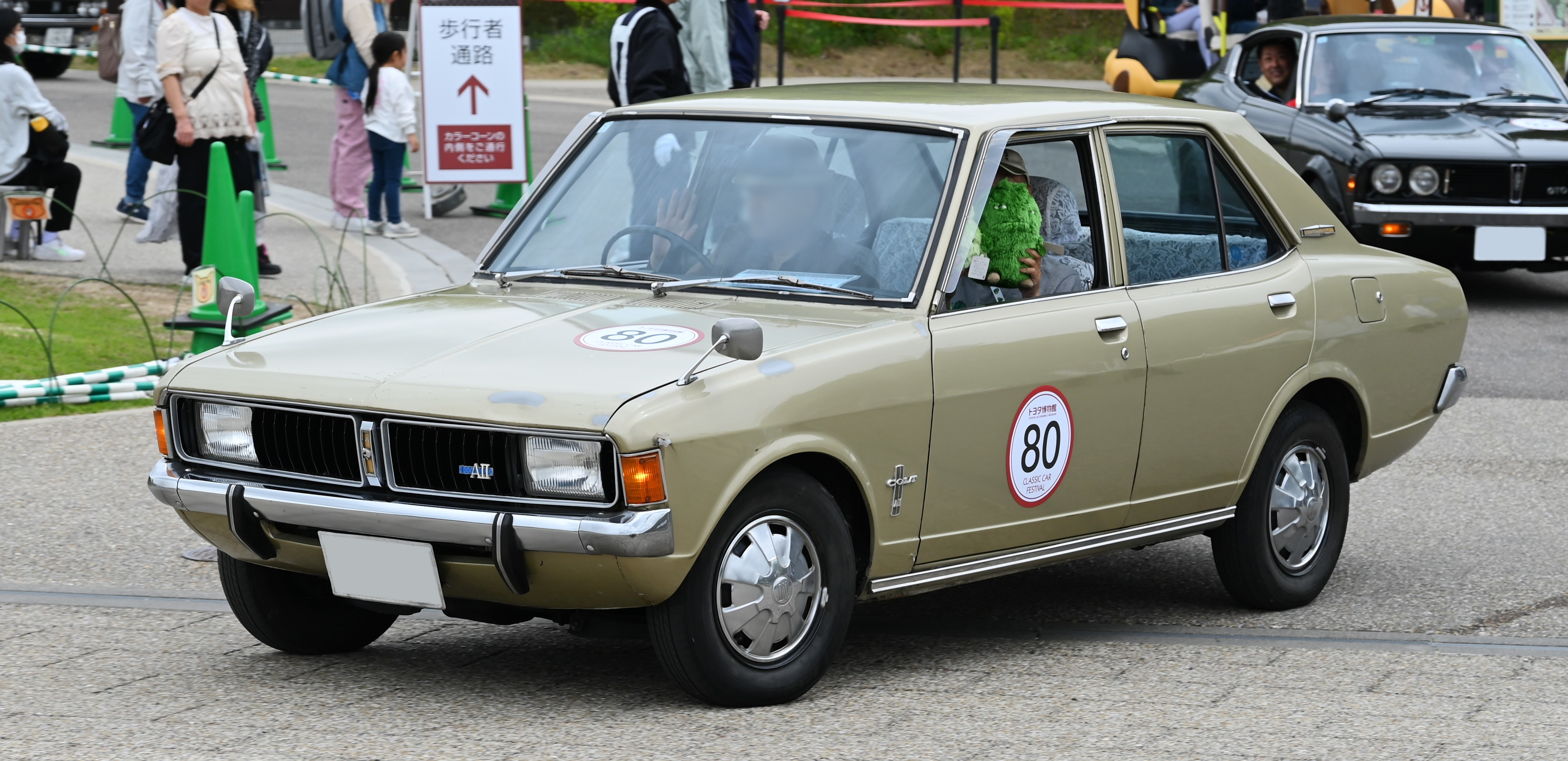
1970 Mitsubishi Colt Galant A II Custom L sedan

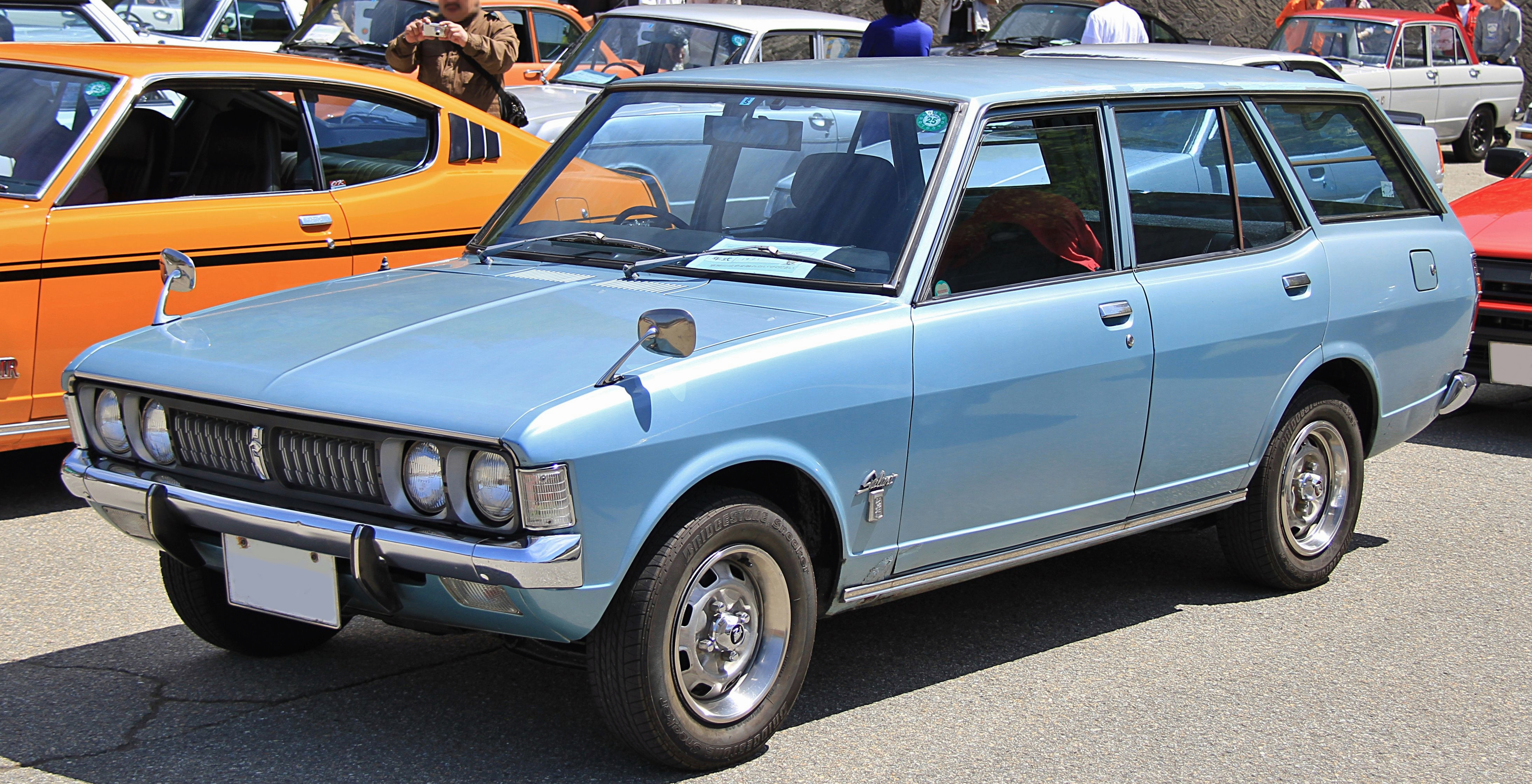
1971 Mitsubishi Colt Galant Estate V 16L GL

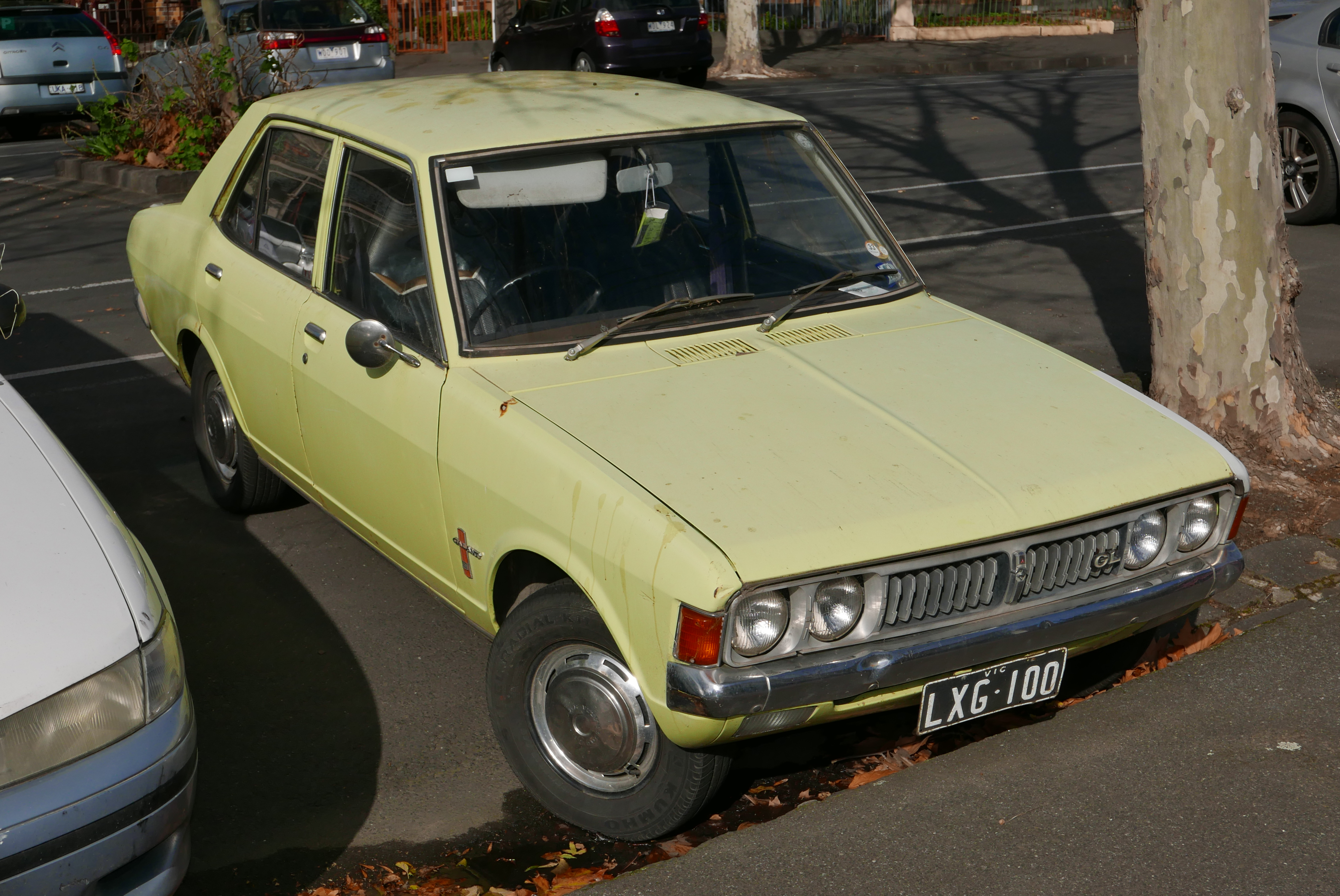
Chrysler Valiant Galant (GB) GL (Australia)

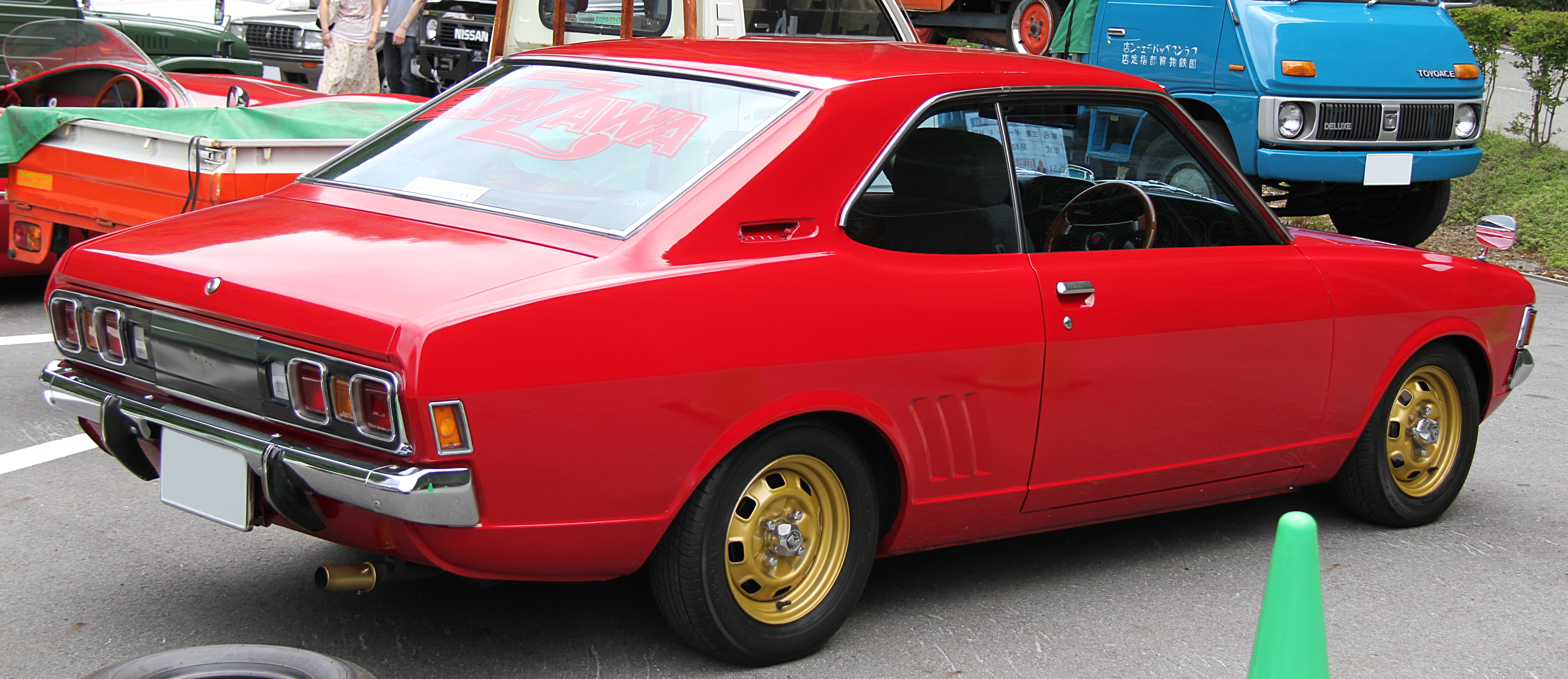
Mitsubishi Colt Galant Hardtop 16L

== Second generation (A112, A114, A115; 1973) ==
Second generation
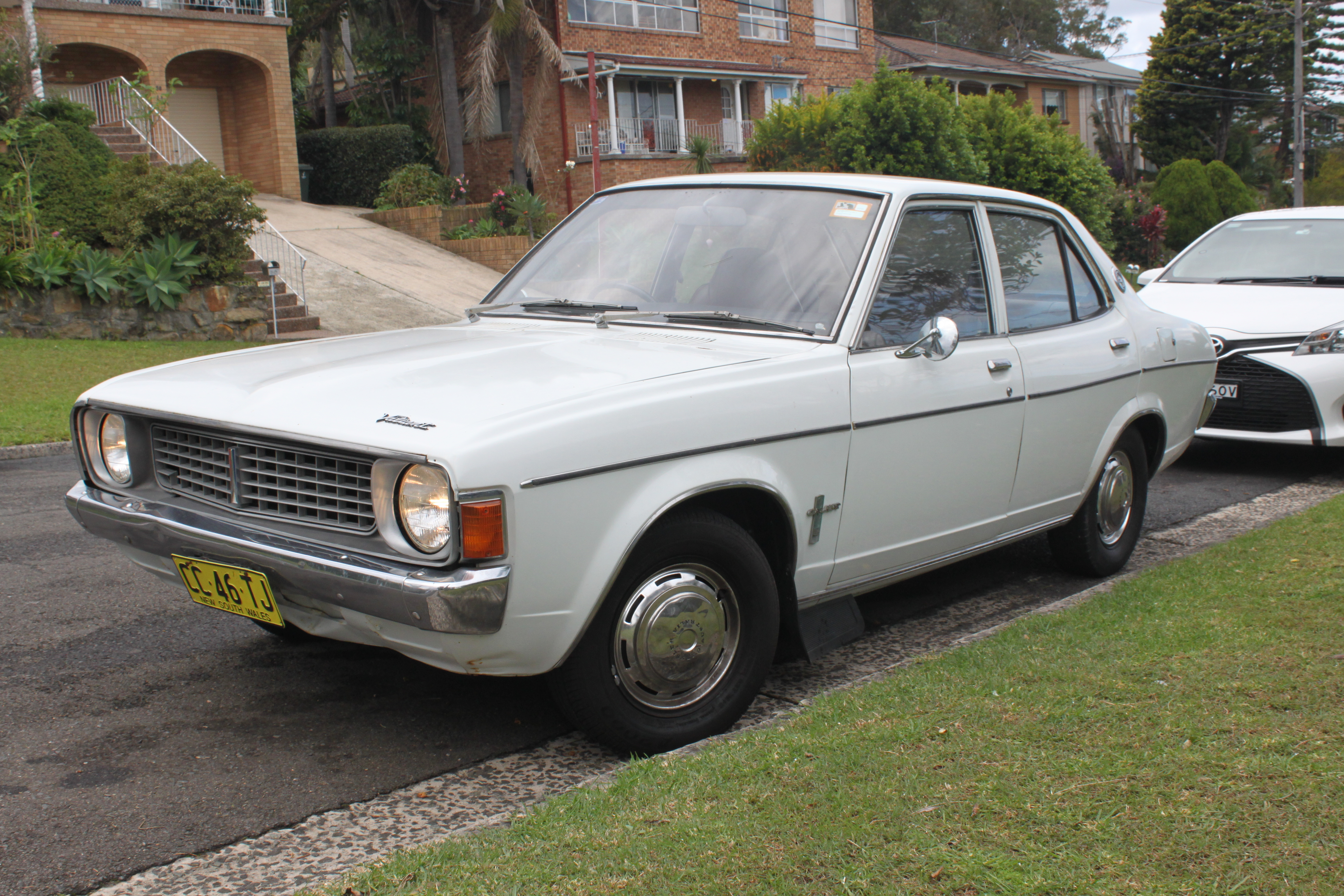
- 1974 Chrysler Valiant Galant (GC) GL sedan

Overview
- Also called: Colt Galant; Chrysler Colt (South Africa); Chrysler Valiant Galant; Chrysler Galant; Dodge Colt; Plymouth Colt; Plymouth Cricket
- Production: 1973–1976; 1974–1977 (Australia)

Body and chassis
- Class: Compact car
- Body style: 2-door hardtop coupé (H); 4-door sedan (A); 5-door station wagon (V)
- Layout: Front-engine, rear-wheel-drive

Powertrain
- Engine: 1597 cc 4G32 I4 (A112); 1855 cc 4G51 I4 (A114); 1995 cc 4G52 I4 (A115)

Dimensions
- Wheelbase: 2,420 mm (95.3 in)
- Length: 4,200 mm (165 in); 4,215 mm (166 in) (Estate)
- Width: 1,600–1,615 mm (63–64 in)
- Height: 1,360–1,395 mm (54–55 in)
- Curb weight: 940 kg (2,070 lb) (Sedan); 925 kg (2,039 lb) (Hardtop); 970 kg (2,140 lb) (Estate)

The second generation Mitsubishi Colt Galant A11* series was built from 1973 and received a replacement in 1976. Introduced on 24 May 1973 (on sale 1 June) in the Japanese domestic market, the second generation Galant was more widely exported as Mitsubishi's ambitions grew. It was again sold by Chrysler in many different guises; as the Dodge Colt in the United States, as the Plymouth Colt and Plymouth Cricket in Canada (from 1974), as the Chrysler Valiant Galant and as the Chrysler Galant in Australia, and in Europe as the Colt Galant. Transmissions were now all floor mounted and include a four-speed manual and a five-speed unit for sportier models. A three-speed automatic transmission was also available. The smaller 1600 engine was also available in the cleaner "MCA-II" version right from 1973, a model which met Japan's 1975 emissions standards. This version was marginally less powerful, with 97 PS (71 kW) rather than the 100 PS (74 kW) engine seen in the previous model.

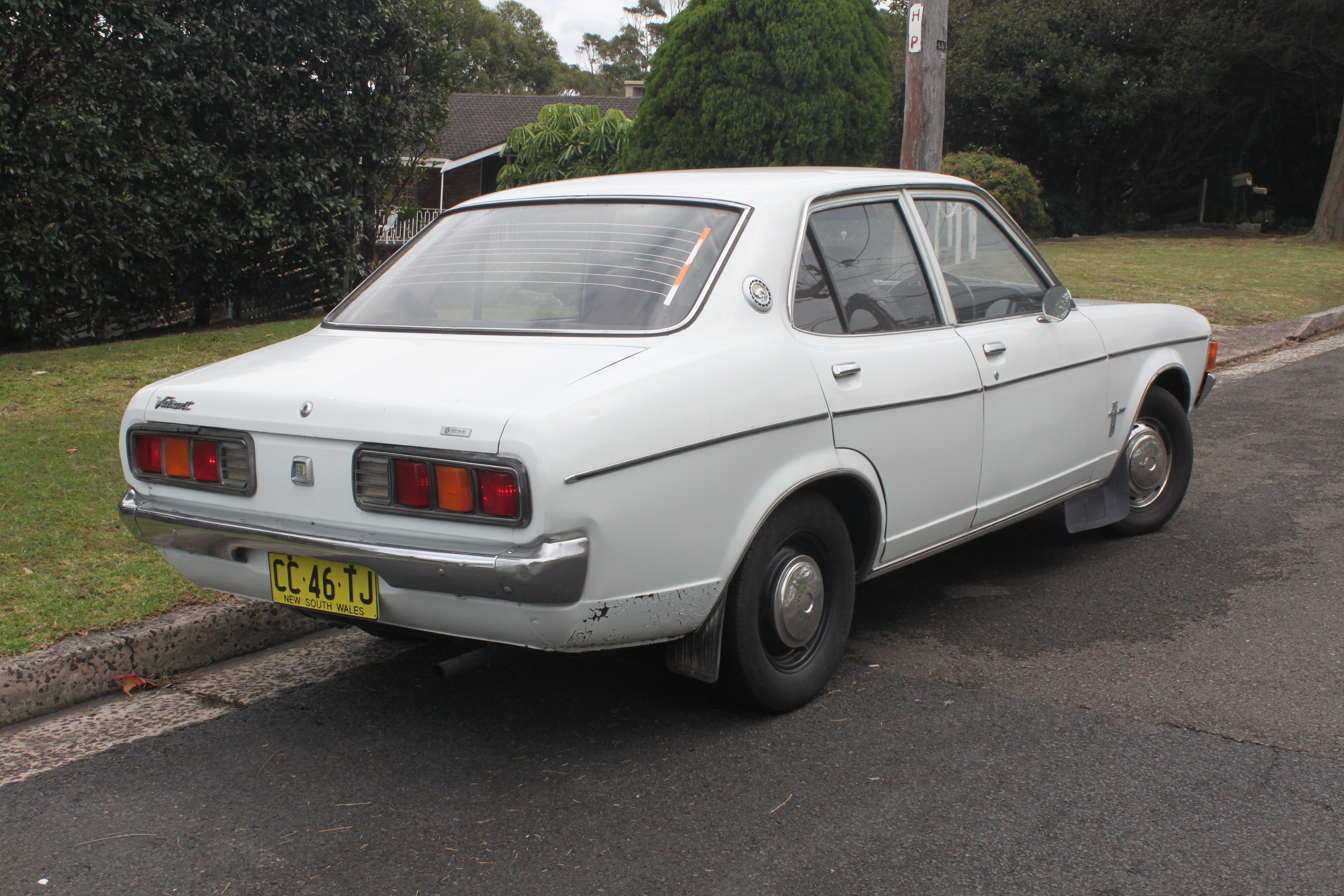
Sedan

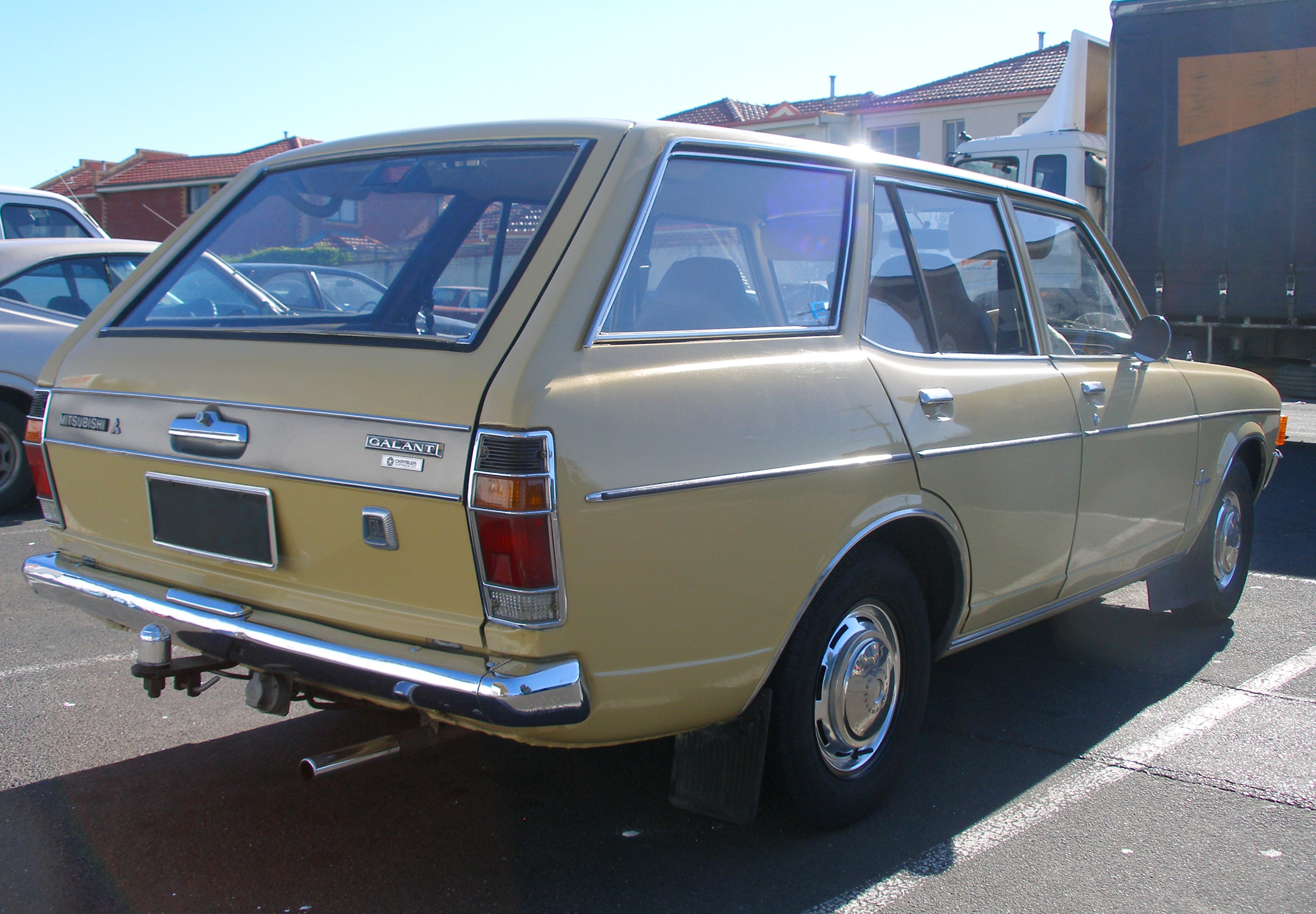
Wagon

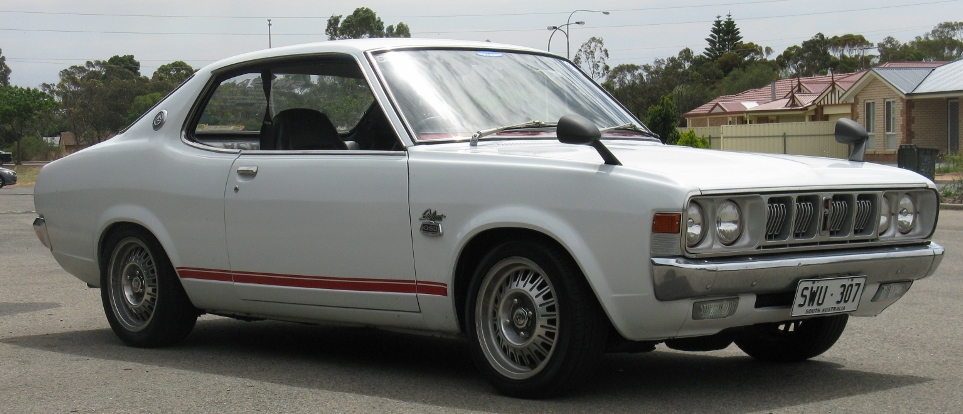
Hardtop

This new Galant model was more curvaceous, influenced by contemporary "coke bottle styling", and featured a range of larger 'Astron' engines developing up to 125 PS in 2000 cc form to complement the 'Saturn' units. During the second generation, the first Astron 80 engines were introduced in some markets using Mitsubishi's newly developed "Silent Shaft" balance shaft technology for reduced vibration and noise. Body styles remained the same as the first generation Colt Galants offered in sedan, wagon, pillar-less two-door hardtop coupé with the addition of a fixed post coupé for some markets. New models were added to the line up, including GL-II, SL-5, GT and GS-II. The Estate (A112V, sold as a commercial vehicle in Japan) was only available with the 100 PS 1600 engine, in Custom, GL, or SL-5 (with a five-speed manual transmission). It had vestigial wood panelling, featuring a narrow strip on the tailgate only.

In New Zealand the hardtop, now with an 1855 cc engine producing 85 kW net (116 hp) at 6,000 rpm, was again assembled by Todd Motors at Porirua. The sedan was not offered as Todd was planning to assemble the larger Galant Sigma sedan and wagon range from late 1977 and they were also still importing the British Avenger and Hunter models, close in size and market to the Galant saloon.

In South Africa, the Dodge Colt 1600 GS arrived in late 1975 (YB series) to replace the earlier AY. Aside from the new body, with wider wheels and improved handling, it also benefitted from a new five-speed gearbox. In August 1976, the name was changed to Chrysler Colt, and the new GS II received a 2.0-liter engine with 85 kW (116 PS; 114 hp). The 1600 also became available in less sporty GL trim, and a set of four-door models complemented the earlier hardtop. This new range signalled a move away from British and Australian sourced Chrysler products, with the four-door replacing the locally built Chrysler Vogue. Only three months later, Chrysler South Africa ceased operations. Mitsubishi production was continued by the new Sigma Motor Corporation.

== Third generation (A120/A130; 1976) ==
Third generation
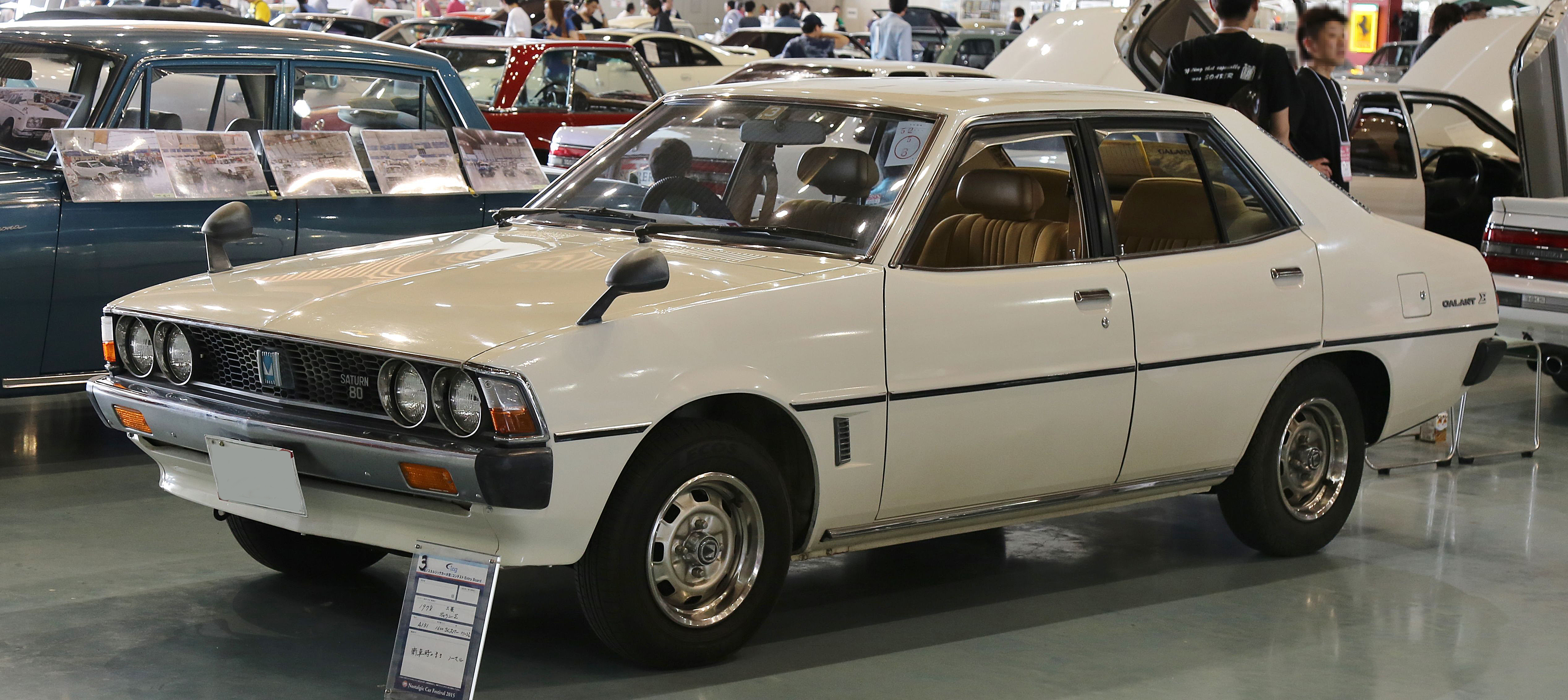
- Mitsubishi Galant Sigma 1600SL Super (Japan; pre-facelift)

Overview
- Also called: Mitsubishi Express (facelifted van; New Zealand); Mitsubishi Galant Sigma; Mitsubishi Sigma; Chrysler Sigma; Colt Galant; Colt Sigma; Dodge Colt (wagon; North America)
- Production: 1976–1982

Body and chassis
- Class: Compact car
- Body style: 4-door sedan; 5-door station wagon
- Layout: Front-engine, rear-wheel-drive
- Related: Galant Λ/Sapporo/Scorpion; Dodge Challenger

Powertrain
- Engine: 1597 cc 4G32/G32B I4 (A121/131); 1850 cc 4G51 I4 (A122); 1995 cc 4G52/G52B I4 (A123/133); 1995 cc 4G52 turbo I4 (Australia); 2555 cc 4G54 I4 (A125)

Dimensions
- Wheelbase: 2,515 mm (99.0 in)
- Length: 4,300–4,450 mm (169.3–175.2 in) (sedan); 4,340–4,490 mm (170.9–176.8 in) (wagon)
- Width: 1,655 mm (65.2 in)
- Height: 1,360 mm (53.5 in) (sedan); 1,385 mm (54.5 in) (wagon)
- Curb weight: 970–1,205 kg (2,138.5–2,656.6 lb) (sedan); 1,055–1,270 kg (2,325.9–2,799.9 lb) (wagon)

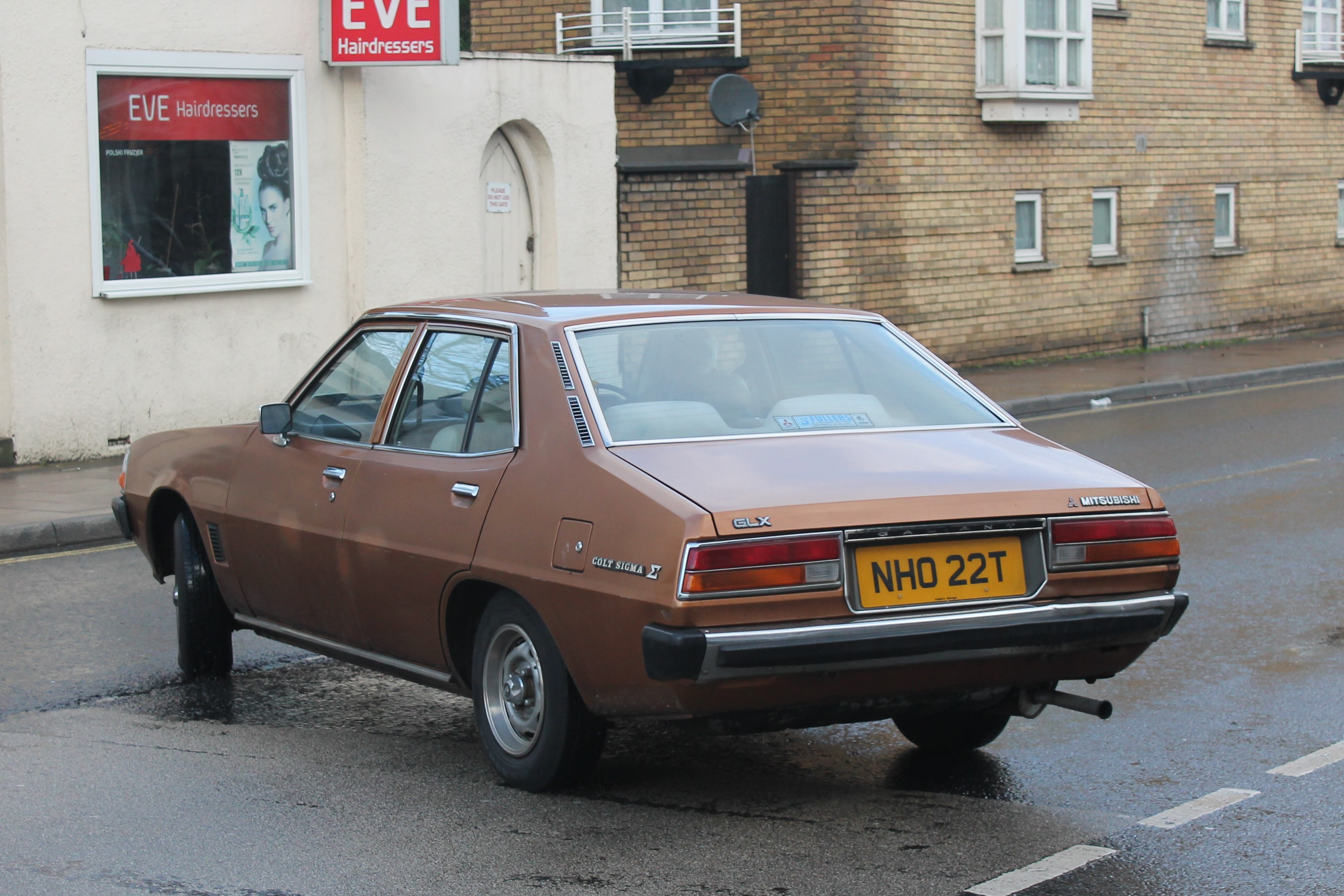
Colt Sigma GLX (UK; pre-facelift)

The third generation of the car was introduced in 1976, and was known as Galant Σ (Sigma). In many export markets the car was simply known as the Mitsubishi Galant. At that time, the Dodge Colt in America was actually a Mitsubishi Lancer, not the Galant anymore, but nonetheless the Galant Wagon variant was sold with the Dodge Colt label in the US and Canada. In Australia, where the car was made locally at Chrysler's Clovelly Park plant, it was marketed as the Chrysler Sigma and, after the 1980 buyout of Chrysler Australia by Mitsubishi, as the Mitsubishi Sigma. Australian content was quite high and included a locally made 2.6-litre 'Astron' four (introduced 1980) which, in December 1985, replaced the 1.6, 1.85 and two-litre engines which were used in other export markets.

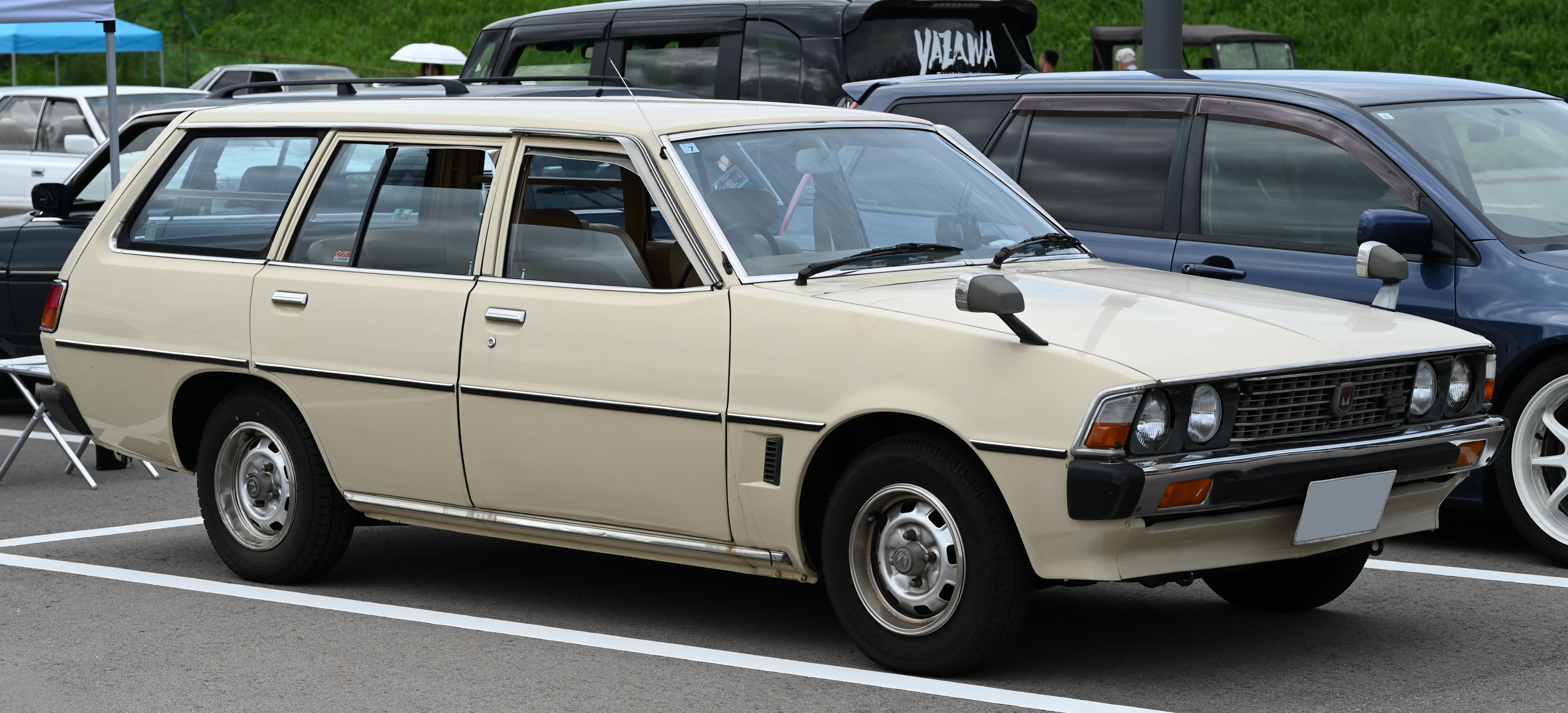

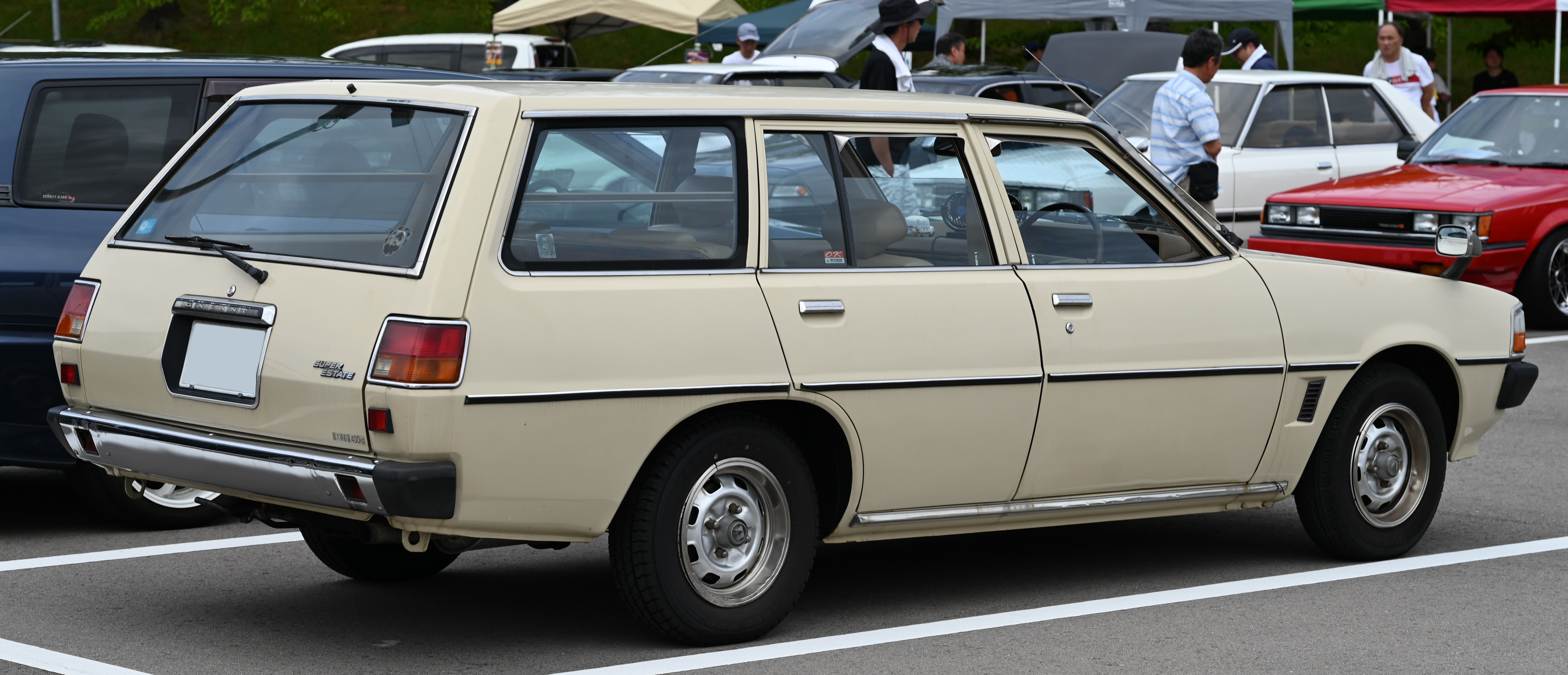
Mitsubishi Galant Estate (Japan; pre-facelift)

The wagon version (Van in Japan) was introduced in August 1977, a little while after the sedans. A new two-door coupé was introduced in 1976 to replace the Galant GTO: It was known in Japan as the Galant Λ (Lambda). The coupé was sold in the United States between 1978 and 1980 as the Dodge Challenger and Plymouth Sapporo. In Australia the Lambda was marketed initially as the Chrysler Sigma Scorpion and latter as the Mitsubishi Scorpion.

In May 1977, Mitsubishi began introducing the MCA-Jet engine for Japan and other emissions-controlled markets on the Galant. Initially only fitted to the regular 1600, this incorporated the "Jet Valve", a secondary intake valve which improved emissions without necessitating the need for a completely redesigned cylinder head. The more powerful, but dirtier twin-carburetted 1600 GS was discontinued on sedans but was added to the Galant Lambda instead. After late 1977 the slower selling 1850 variant was discontinued, as Mitsubishi focussed their efforts on making the 1600 and the 2000 engines pass the new, stricter emissions standards.

In 1978, Mitsubishi in Japan established a dedicated dealership sales channel called (Japanese: Galant Restaurant) to sell the Galant and other selected vehicles. In Japan, the Galant range received a new variant in March 1978, known as Galant Sigma Eterna. This model has single rectangular headlights and different taillights. This model also sold as facelift model for selected markets in Europe, New Zealand and South America. Seven months later the twin round headlights front design was replaced with one featuring twin square headlights and also new taillights. Models with engines which passed the new 1978 standards changed from the A120 to the A130 range. Mitsubishi had limited resources, and the large choice of engines for the Galant lineup was reduced to one 1.6 and one 2.0 in the Japanese market, with 86 and 105 PS (63 and 77 kW), at the beginning of the 1979 model year.

=== Exports and foreign assembly ===
Todd Motors initially assembled 1.6 GL, 1.85 GLX and two-litre GLS sedan models for New Zealand, with the GLS getting a five-speed manual transmission as standard with three-speed auto optional. These were the first NZ-assembled Mitsubishis to have rear screen demisters as standard. Early cars had conventional rod-suspended headliners developed locally to meet local content rules but these were notorious for collapsing on to the passengers' heads and were quickly replaced by newly developed, glued-in moulded foam liners. The range was later revised to add the wagon and drop the 1.85-litre engine.

The third generation Galant was the recipient of the Car of the Year award in South Africa in 1977. In South Africa, where it was built by the Sigma Motor Corporation, it was sold as the Colt Galant. Originally sold with the 1.6- and the 2.0-liter engines, the automatic-only 2.6-liter engine arrived in the middle of 1979 and was developed locally. The 2.6 arrived elsewhere only later. Mid-1979 was also when the facelifted (square headlights) model appeared in South Africa, with new "low-inertia" engines. Power output for the 2.0-liter remained at 65.5 kW (89 PS; 88 hp), but period testers felt it more powerful than the previous version.

In the United Kingdom, the local importer eschewed the Mitsubishi name and sold them as "Colts" instead. To set it apart from the slow-selling predecessor ("Colt Galant"), this generation was sold as the Colt Sigma. For the fourth generation, the Colt Car Company switched back to the Galant model name. It was available as a saloon or an estate, with the 1.6 or 2.0-litre engines. An automatic transmission was available on the saloons.

Claimed, DIN power outputs in the European market were considerably lower than the JIS Gross ratings used in Japan. The 2-litre engine had a claimed realistic 85 PS (63 kW) in Europe, fewer than the 1.6 in Japan.

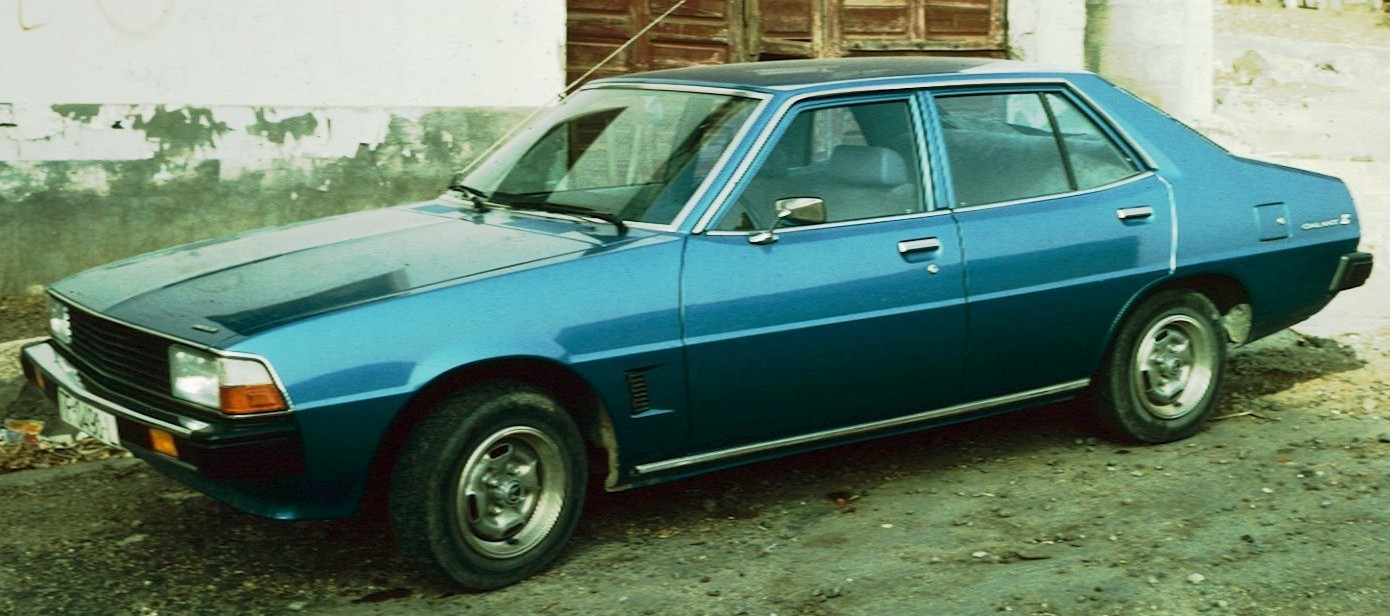
Mitsubishi Galant Sigma Eterna (Spain)

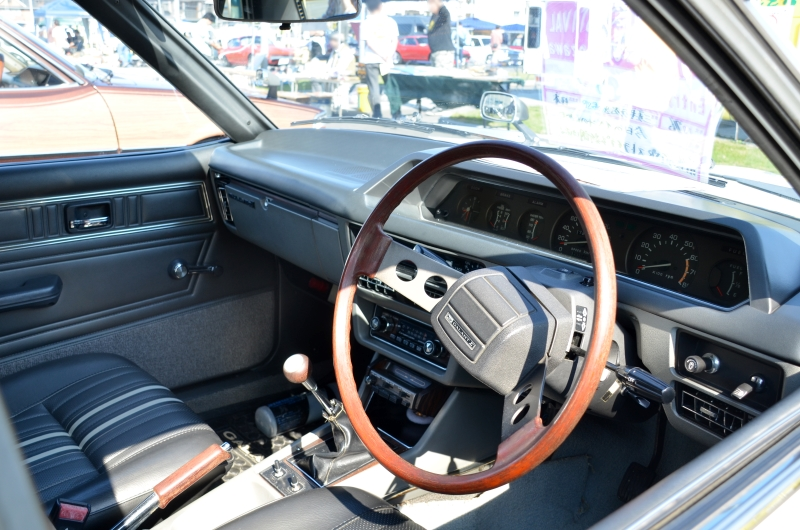
Interior (Sigma 2000 GSR)

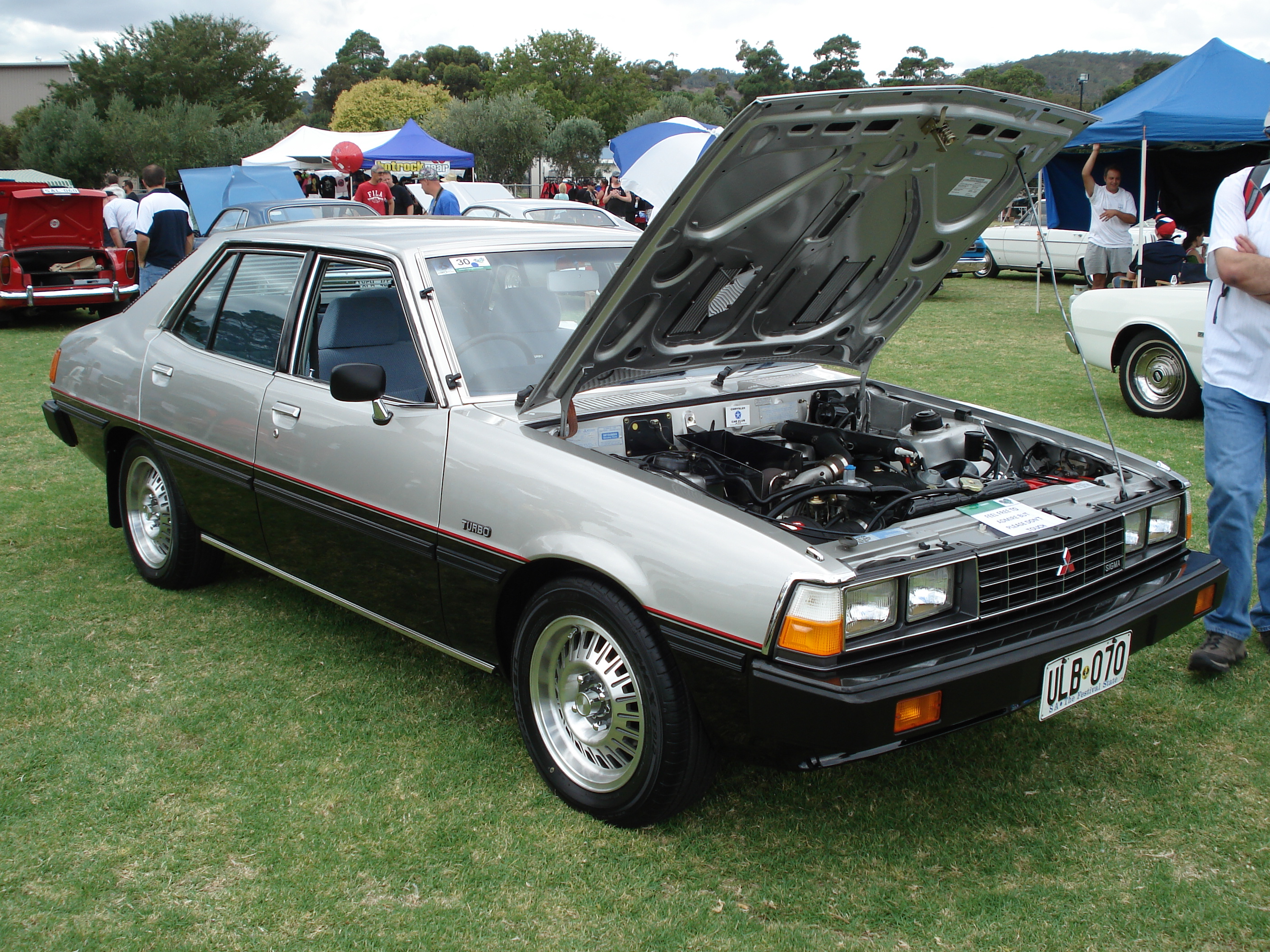
Mitsubishi Sigma Turbo GH (Australia; facelift)

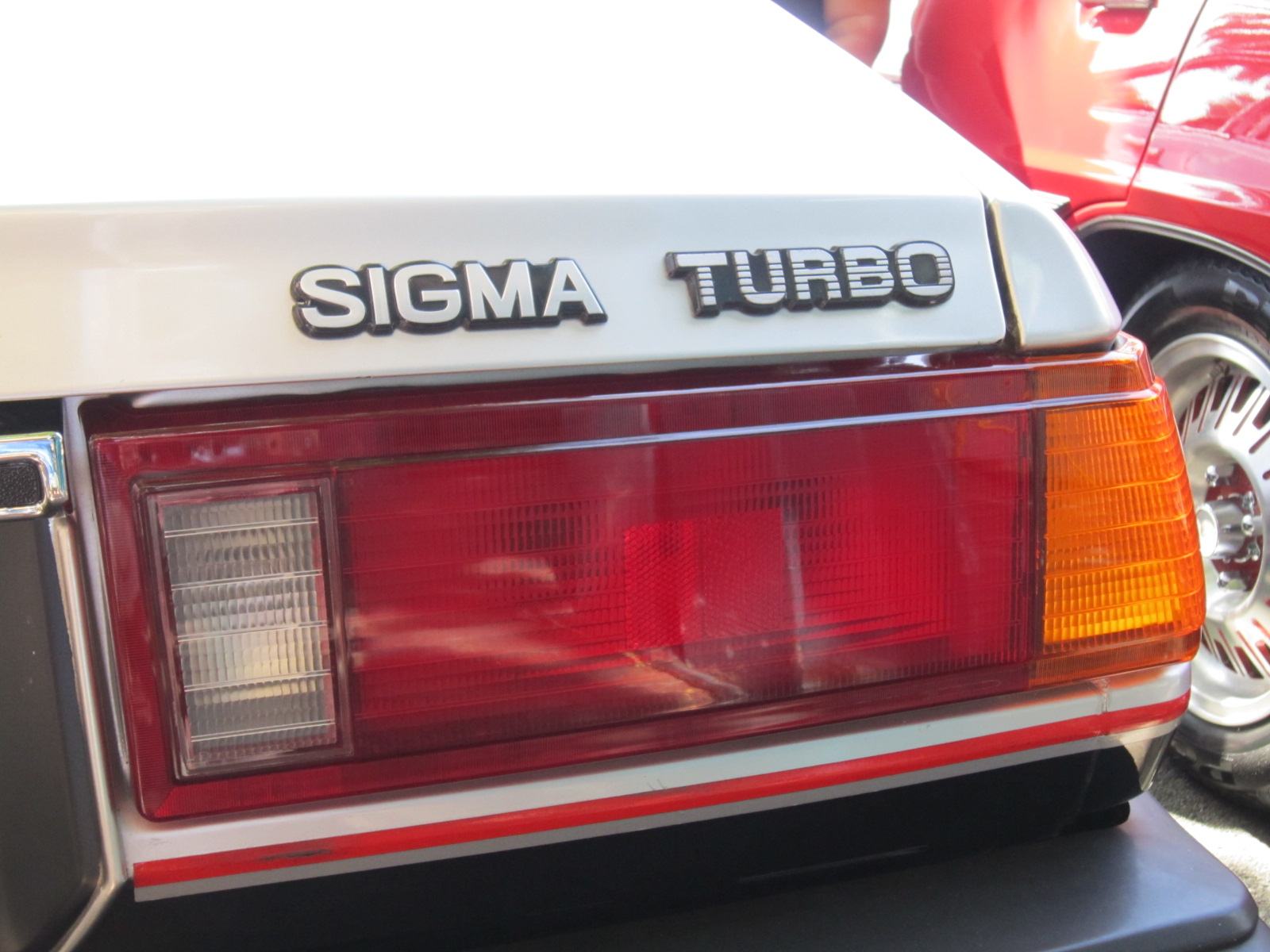
Facelifted taillights

== Fourth generation (A160; 1980) ==
Fourth generation
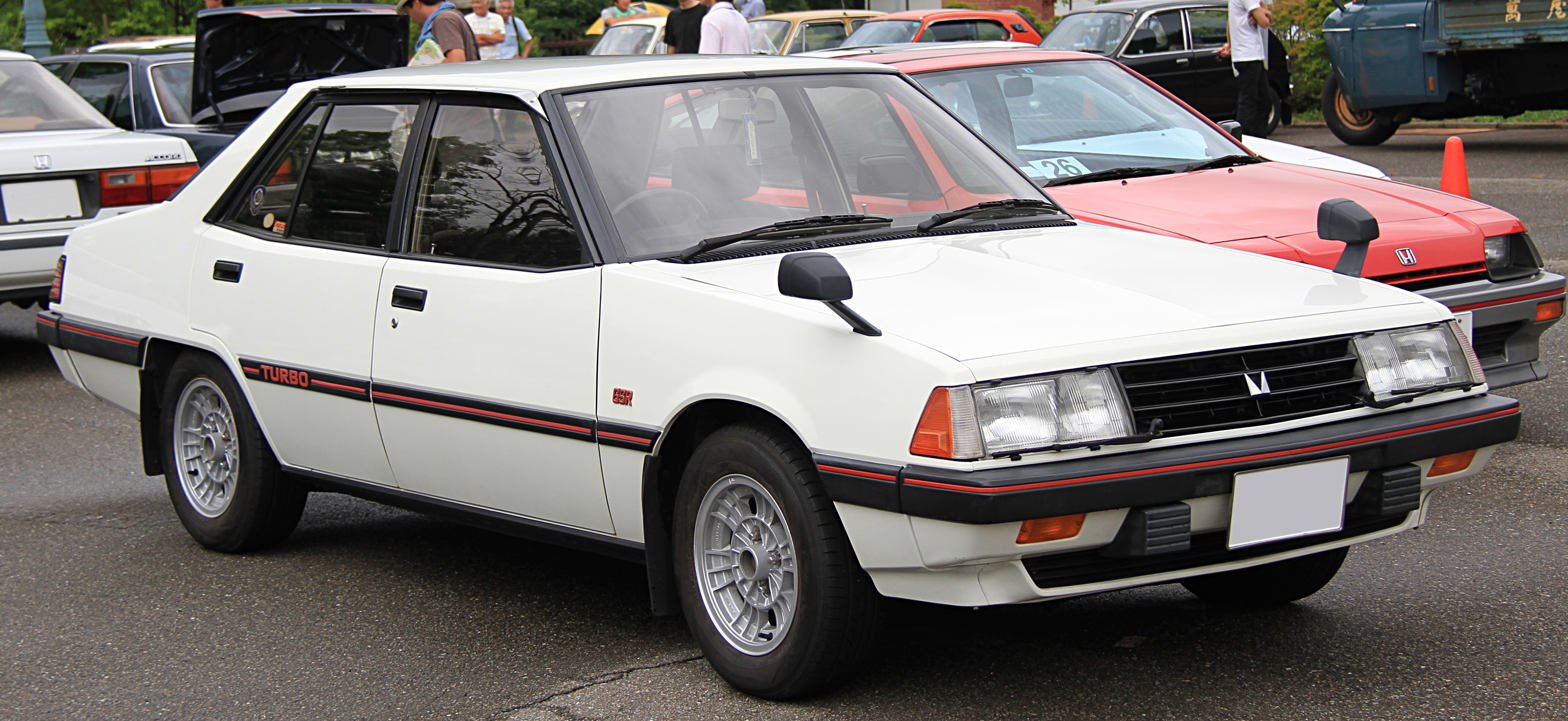
- 1982 Mitsubishi Galant Σ Turbo (JDM)

Overview
- Also called: Mitsubishi Eterna Σ Mitsubishi Sigma; Lonsdale
- Production: April 1980–1987

Body and chassis
- Class: Compact car
- Body style: 2-door coupé (Lambda); 4-door sedan 5-door station wagon
- Layout: Front-engine, rear-wheel-drive
- Related: Galant Λ/Sapporo/Scorpion; Chrysler Sigma

Powertrain
- Engine: petrol: 1597 cc 4G32 I4; 1795 cc 4G62 I4; 1995 cc 4G52 I4; 1995 cc 4G52T Turbo I4 (Australia); 1997 cc G63B/4G63 I4; 1997 cc 4G63T Turbo I4; 2555 cc 4G54 I4; diesel: 2346 cc 4D55 turbodiesel I4
- Transmission: 5-speed manual 3-speed automatic

Dimensions
- Wheelbase: 2,530 mm (99.6 in)
- Length: 4,570 mm (179.9 in)
- Width: 1,680 mm (66.1 in)
- Height: 1,380 mm (54.3 in)
- Curb weight: 1,190 kg (2,623.5 lb)

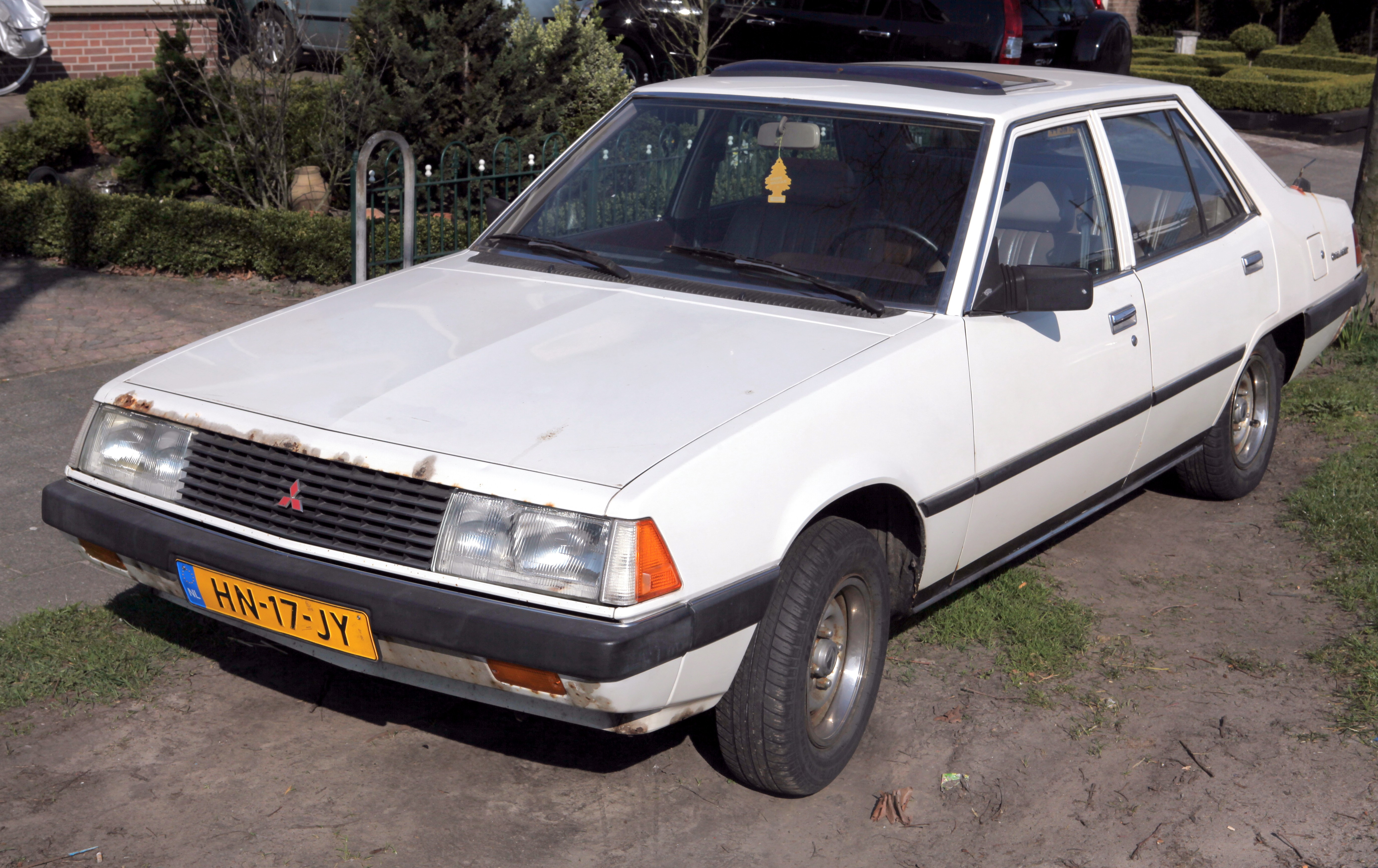
Mitsubishi Galant 1600 EL (Europe)

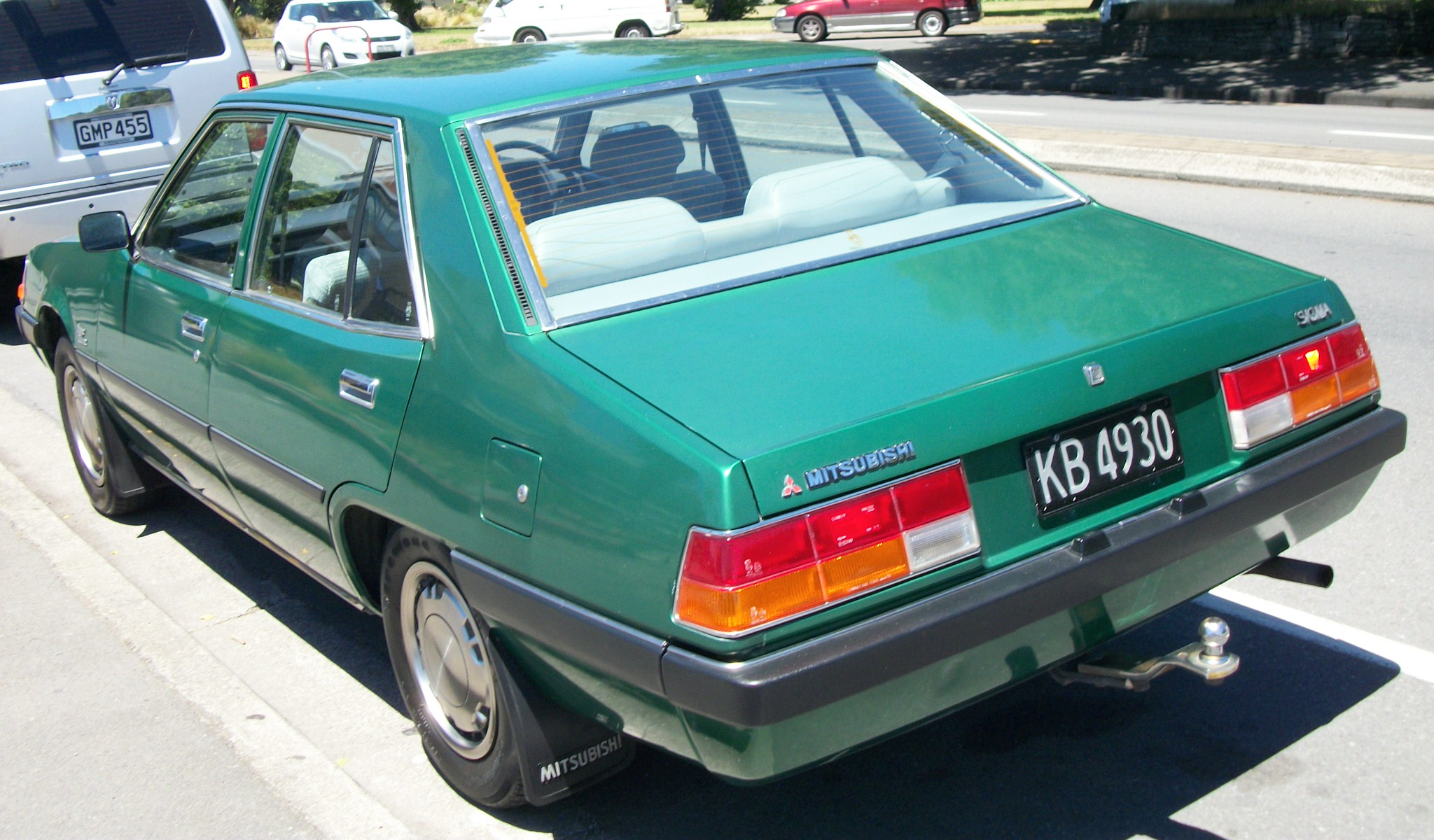
Mitsubishi Sigma Super Saloon (New Zealand)

Introduced in 1980, Mitsubishi's fourth iteration of the Galant Σ (Sigma)/Eterna Σ (Sigma) debuted many new innovations for Mitsubishi. The car was sold as the Mitsubishi Galant in most export markets, although in both Australia and New Zealand it was known as the Mitsubishi Sigma. The fourth generation sedan and coupé were both slightly larger than the third generation cars. Additional emphasis was given to ergonomics, aerodynamics, and safety. Shoulder room, leg room, and head space were all increased, and the trunk was slightly enlarged for more luggage capacity. The interior was made quieter with additional carpeting and other acoustic dampening materials and a double-thickness front bulkhead. The wagon version was also changed, although from the firewall back the vehicle remained the same as the previous version.

Their new 'Sirius' engine was offered in turbocharged form for performance enthusiasts in some markets, with 145 PS (107 kW) for Japanese market cars and 156 PS (115 kW) for those export markets unencumbered by strict emissions rules. A new electronic fuel injection system was introduced on some versions of the gasoline Astron engine. For economy, an 'Astron' 4D55, the first turbo-diesel engine in a Japanese passenger car, was also offered. Unusually, the fourth Galant was never offered with a naturally aspirated diesel engine. The 2.3 Turbo D has 84 PS (62 kW), enough to be considered "sporty" at the time, and was first shown at the 1980 Paris Motor Show. The diesel had some initial reliability issues; a redesigned cylinder head which appeared in 1982 took care of the problems. This model proved very popular in some markets, such as the BeNeLux countries, where it helped establish Mitsubishi in general and the Galant in particular.

For the second generation in a row Mitsubishi could claim to be building an award-winning car, as this was chosen as Car of the Year in New Zealand in 1981. The cars sold there were again locally assembled with 1.6 and two-litre engines, and a choice of transmissions and trim. As elsewhere, the wagon versions carried over the old body style with a new nose and interior. Production of the wagon version continued in Australia until 1987 when it was replaced by the new Magna.

From 1982 to 1983, some of the Australian Sigmas, which had the carried-over 2.0 or 2.6-litre locally made inline-four engine, were exported to the United Kingdom with the Lonsdale badge, in en effort at circumventing the voluntary import quota restrictions adopted by Japanese manufacturers. However the car was unsuccessful, and for 1983 and 1984 it carried Mitsubishi Sigma badges in the UK before imports were finally discontinued.

The two door coupé was also redesigned for 1980 and was sold through 1983. While continuing with the Galant Λ/Eterna Λ label for the domestic Japanese market, the fourth generation was known as the Mitsubishi Scorpion in Australia, and the Dodge Challenger and Plymouth Sapporo in the United States.

== Fifth generation (E10; 1983) ==
Fifth generation
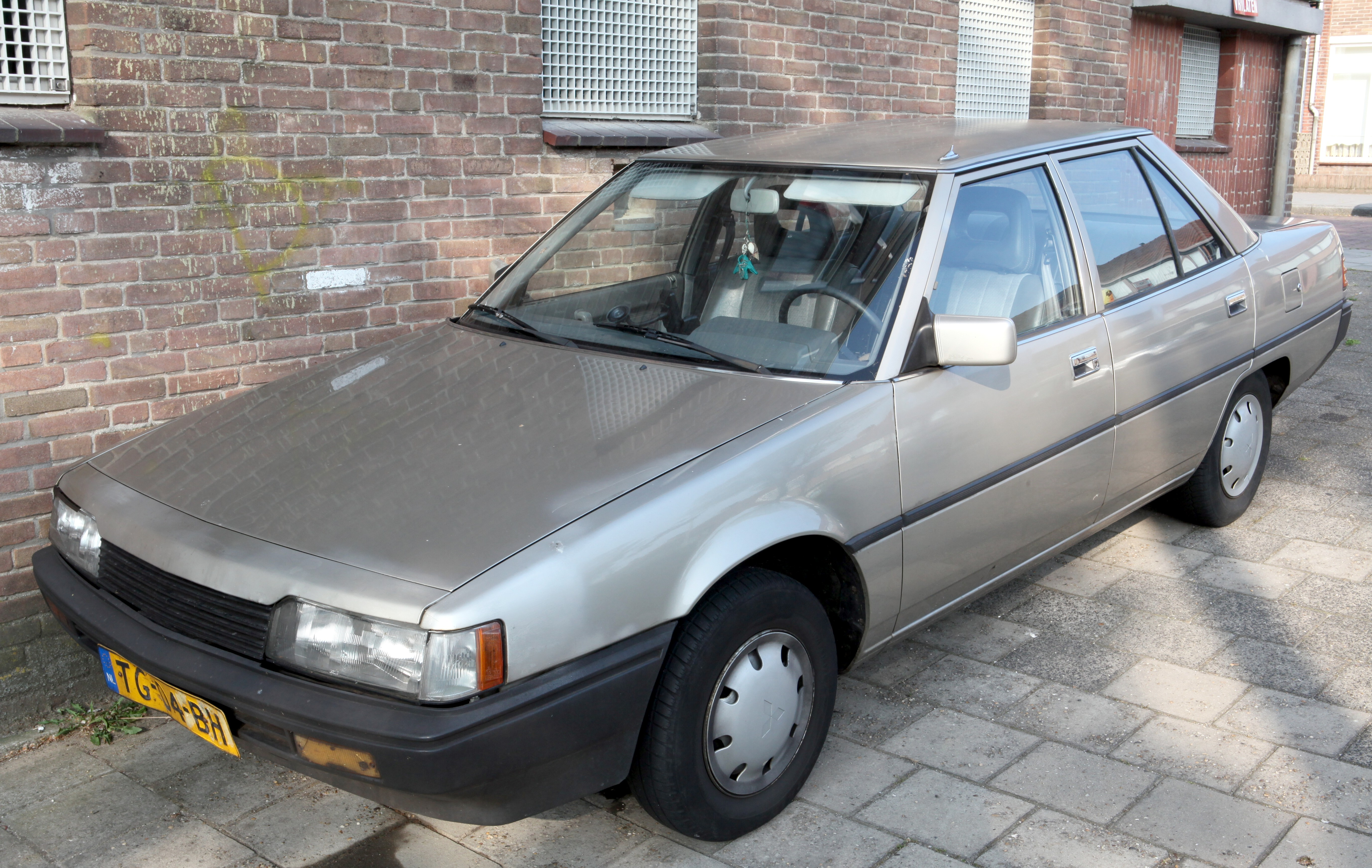
- European market Galant

Overview
- Production: 1983–1989; 1983–1999 (Taxi); 1984–1999

Body and chassis
- Class: Mid-size car
- Body style: 4-door sedan 4-door hardtop sedan
- Layout: Front-engine, front-wheel-drive
- Related: Mitsubishi Magna

Powertrain
- Engine: petrol: 1597 cc 4G32 I4 (E11A); 1755 cc 4G37 I4 (E12A); 1795 cc 4G62 I4 (E13A); 1834 cc 4G93 LPG I4 (E19A); 1997 cc G63B/4G63 I4 (E15A); 1997 cc 4G63T turbo I4 (E15A); 1998 cc 6G71 V6 (E17A); 2351 cc 4G64 I4 (E16A); 2972 cc 6G72 V6 (E18A); diesel: 1795 cc 4D65 turbo I4 (E14A)
- Transmission: 3-speed automatic 4-speed automatic 4X2-speed manual 5-speed manual

Dimensions
- Wheelbase: 2,600 mm (102.4 in)
- Length: 4,580 mm (180.3 in)
- Width: 1,695 mm (66.7 in)
- Height: 1,385 mm (54.5 in)
- Curb weight: 1,160 kg (2,557.4 lb)

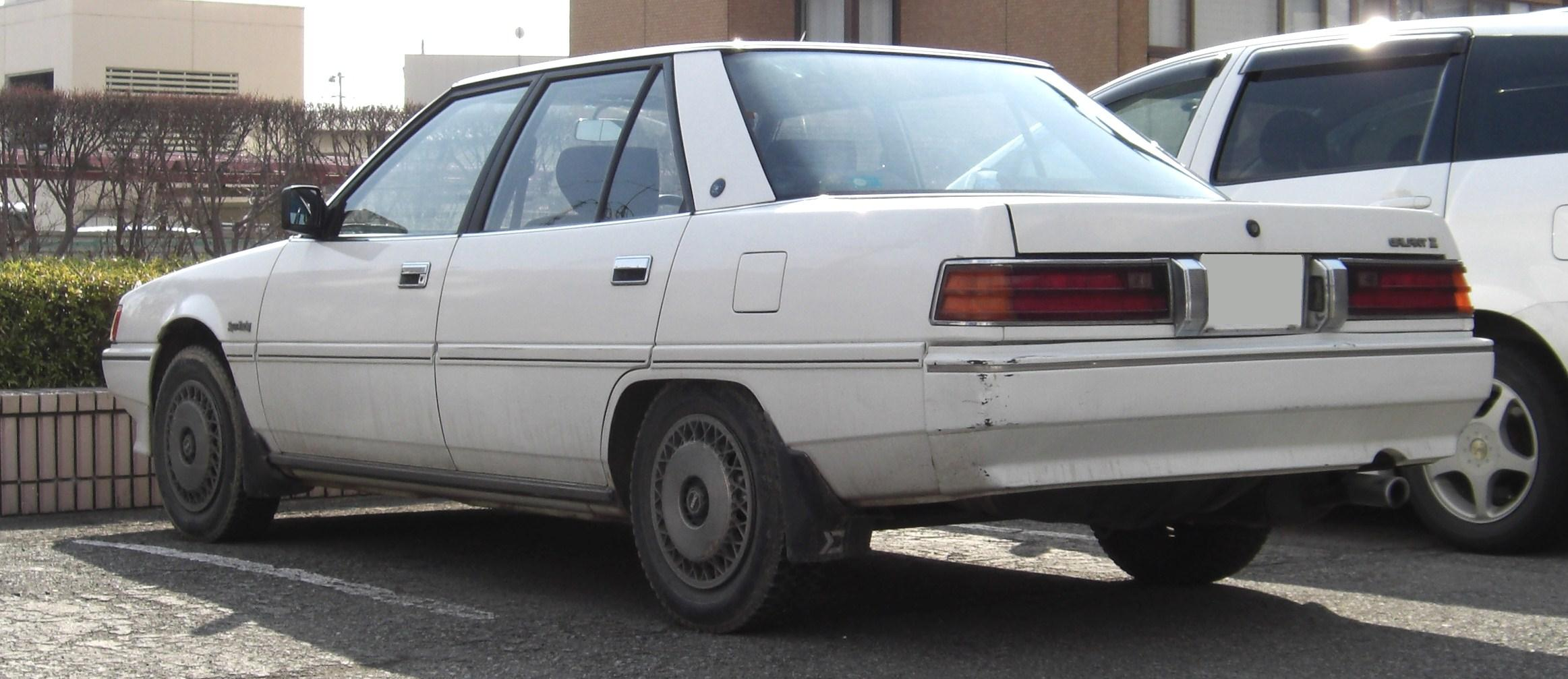
Mitsubishi Galant Σ sedan (Japan)

A fifth-generation model shifted to front-wheel drive in August 1983 as a four-door sedan and four-door hardtop (with different styling). The design continued the direction started with the Tredia, albeit with more harmonious proportions. Drag resistance was down to an average Cd=0.36. All new chassis numbers, from E11A to E19A, marked the change. External dimensions all grew, but only marginally, while the wheelbase was 7 cm (2.8 in) longer. Thanks to the more compact drivetrain, however, passenger space increased noticeably and the boot grew from 272 to 360 L (9.6 to 12.7 cu ft) while the liftover edge was significantly lowered. Weight distribution was distinctly towards the front, with 64.47% of the car's weight over the front wheels for the turbodiesel. In the Japanese market there was also a parallel "Eterna" lineup with very minor differences in appearance and equipment. This generation formed the basis of the widened (by 4 inches/100 mm) Mitsubishi Magna produced in Australia from 1985, the same year in which Mitsubishi won Bild am Sonntag's Das Goldene Lenkrad (Golden Steering Wheel) award in Germany for the Galant and Wheels magazine's Car of the Year for the Magna. Mitsubishi Motors codenamed these cars as "YF" and "YFW"—"W" for "wide", respectively.

The station wagon version was effectively replaced by the Chariot/Space Wagon in most markets. The Galant was the third Japanese car to adopt four-wheel anti-lock brakes, using Bosch's ABS system. Vehicles in Japan installed with the four-speed transmission were equipped with what Mitsubishi called Super Shift, essentially installing a transfer case, without adding another driveshaft to the rear wheels. Super Shift was no longer offered with the introduction of the five-speed manual transmission.

Exports began about a year after introduction. European and rest-of-the-world trim levels were often engine-specific, depending on the market: At the time of introduction, GL and GLX models were offered with either 1.6-litre or 1.8-litre engines, GLS models had 2.0-litre engines (badged 2000 GLS; in some markets there was also a 2000 GLX) and Diesel versions had a 1.8-litre Sirius turbo-diesel engine. The diesel model received GL or GLX trim, although in some markets it was simply the 1800 TD. A fuel injected 150 PS (110 kW) 2000 Turbo was also available in some export markets. The TD and the Turbo both received standard power steering.

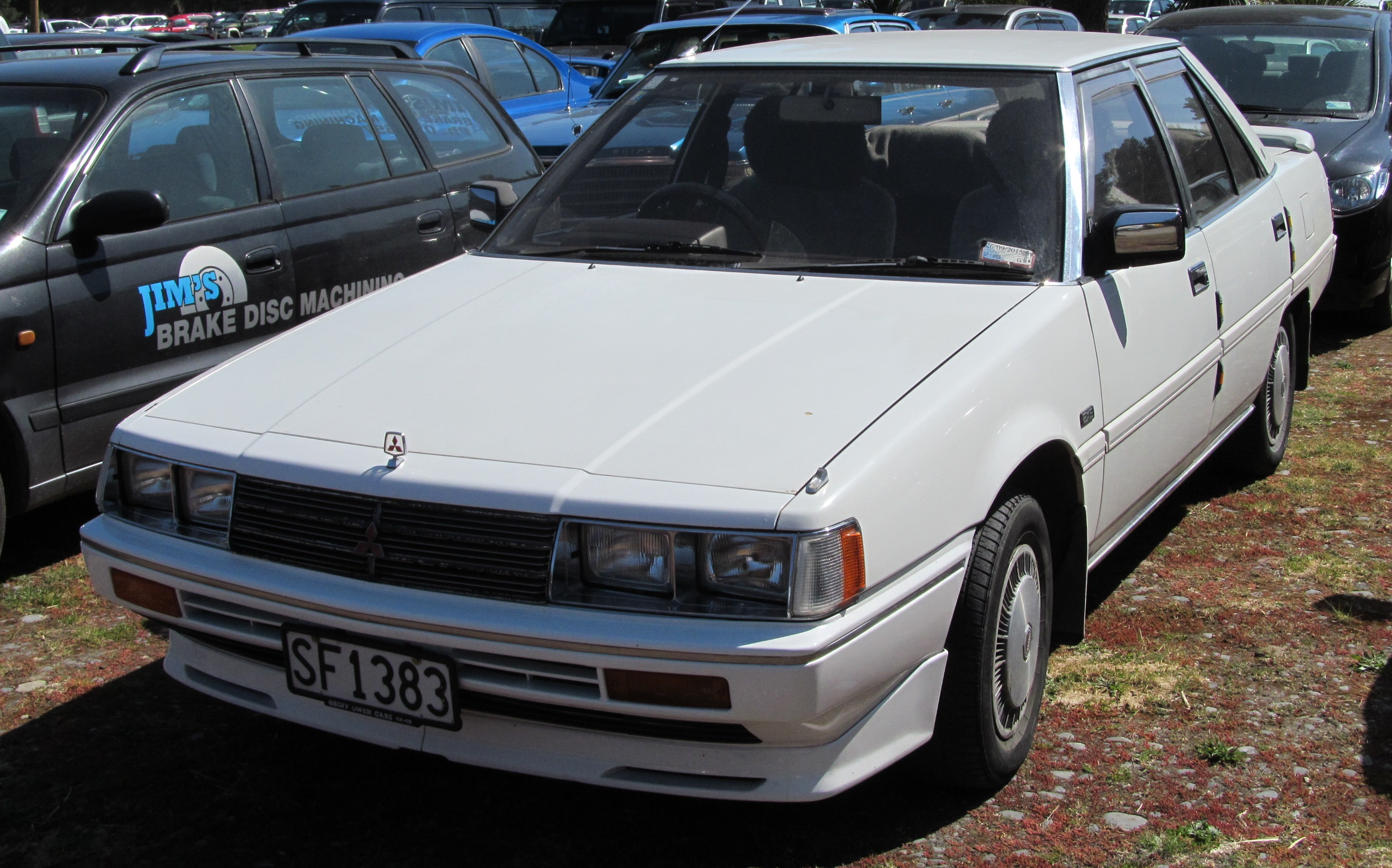
Mitsubishi Eterna EXE (Japan)

Equipment levels in Japan had more interesting names, ranging from the LS and LG via Super Saloon, Super Touring, Super Exceed, and GSR-X up to the most luxurious Royal. The top models for Japan (the "Super Exceed" sedan or "VR" hardtop) were powered by the 200 PS (147 kW) (JIS gross, later only 170 PS were claimed) turbocharged and intercooled "Sirius Dash 3/2 valve" engine. This engine switched between using two and three valves per cylinder to combine high top-end power with low-end drivability as well being economical in operation.

Beginning in October 1986, the all-new 2-liter Cyclone V6 engine was installed in the Galant/Eterna, sedans as well as hardtops, shared with the all-new executive limousine Debonair. Some of the V6 variants received electrically retractable door mirrors and electronically controlled power steering.

Sales in the United States began with the 1985 model year, joining the new Mitsubishi dealership network that started operations in 1981. This was the first time the Galant series was sold stateside since the station wagon was marketed as a Dodge Colt a few years earlier. The mid-model refresh was offered for 1987, adding redesigned seats and the availability of a five-speed manual transmission and leather upholstery, and remained until 1990, sold alongside the sixth generation Galant.

The widened Australian-made version, however, remained in production until 1991 when it was replaced by a new generation Magna, whereas the Japanese hardtop range was produced until it was replaced by the new Sigma/Diamante version in 1990. In addition, the taxi-spec sedan remained in production for Japanese commercial use until December 1999, when Mitsubishi abandoned that market. The taxi was only available with an LPG-powered 1.8-litre engine, originally the 4G37. From October 1986 the Taxi (and driving school model) was fitted with Mitsubishi's new "Cyclone" combustion chamber design.

At the end of October 1990, the Galant Σ Taxi received a light update and a reshuffle of the models. There was a base L model and a better equipped LG with body-colored bumpers. The modification included three-point belts in the rear seat, a high-mounted brake light, adjusted gearing, a flattened rear seat squab, larger radiator, and a larger washer fluid tank, amongst other detail improvements. A five-speed manual, or three- or four-speed automatics were on offer. Target production was around 1,200 units per year. For its last three years of production, this model received an LPG-version of the 1834 cc "4G93" engine.

=== New Zealand – Sigma and V3000 ===
The fifth-generation Galant was introduced to the New Zealand market in mid-1984, as the Mitsubishi Sigma. Assembled by Mitsubishi's New Zealand distributors, Todd Motors, the Sigma was available with the choice of 1.8- and 2.0-litre engines, the 2.0 having the option of automatic transmission, and later also availability with a turbocharger on certain models. The carburetted 2.0 produces 76 kW (102 hp; 103 PS).

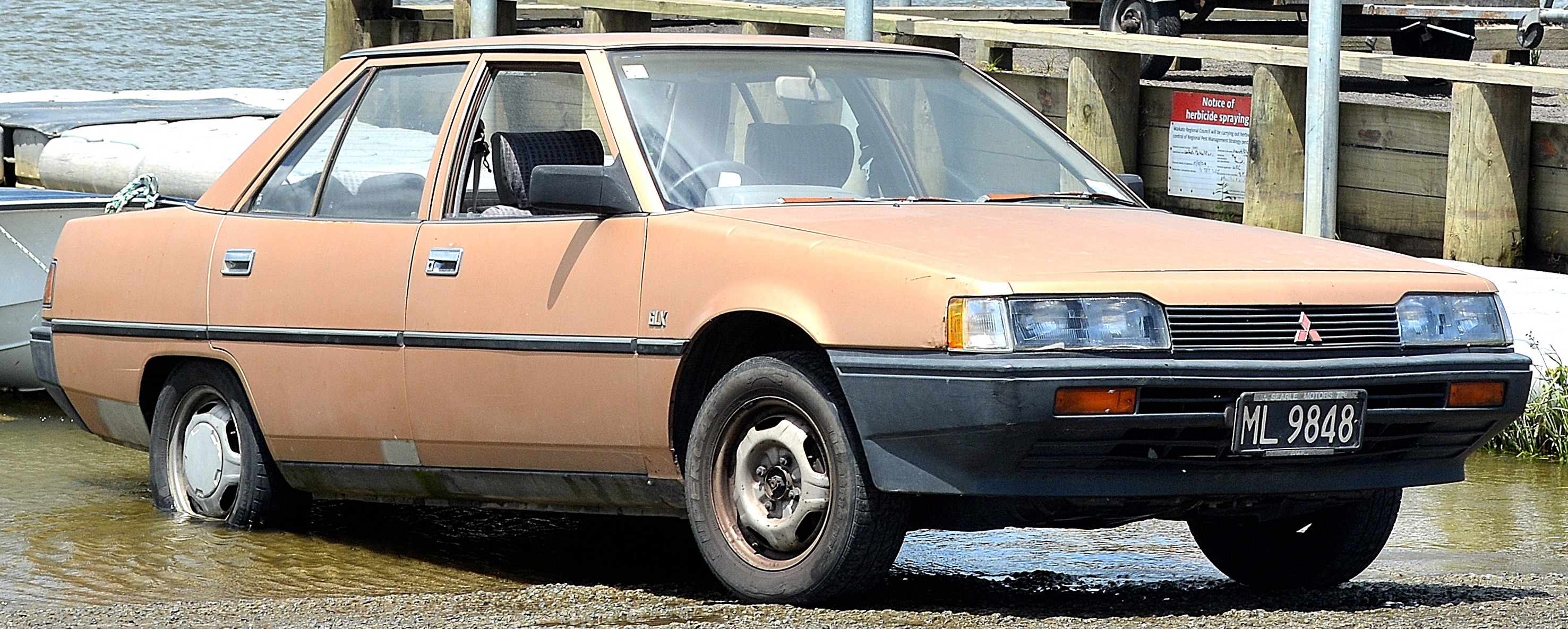
Mitsubishi Sigma GLX (New Zealand)

Several trim levels were offered, GL, GLX, GSR, Super Saloon and SE. The top SE versions notably featured 'Sigma' branded alloy wheels, digital instrumentation, climate controlled air conditioning, cruise control, speed-dependent intermittent wipers and a salmon-brown coloured interior treatment, the treatment changing deep red colour as a running change in 1985 on this model.

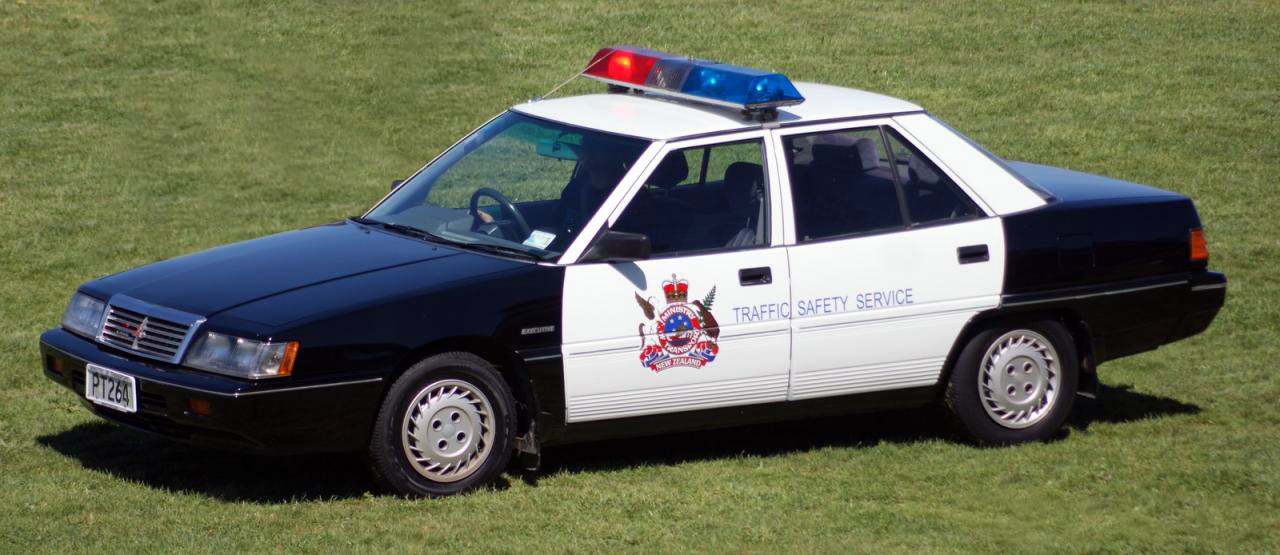
1990–1991 Mitsubishi V3000 Executive (New Zealand)

Further running changes concerned the rear styling. For the initial 1984 production run the rear numberplate was located above the bumper, however for 1985 and 1986 the plate was relocated to below the bumper, in the manner of the Japanese domestic market Galant models. New taillights were fitted for 1987, the rear numberplate reverting to its original place above the bumper.

1987 was a key year for Mitsubishi in New Zealand, when it bought out Todd Motors' automotive operations. Although the sixth generation Galant was introduced for 1988, the older fifth generation bodyshell stayed in production alongside it. Mitsubishi Motors New Zealand intentionally decided to retain the fifth generation sedan bodystyle for a new, unique to New Zealand, flagship model—the 110 kW (148 hp) 3.0-liter V6 engined Mitsubishi V3000. The V3000 was developed specifically to give Mitsubishi New Zealand a six-cylinder family car, suitable for towing boats and caravans, to compete with the imported Ford Falcon (EA) and Holden Commodore (VN) models.

While the rear styling of the previous Sigma model was retained, the frontal treatment was changed to now feature a more formal, upright chrome grille (the bonnet and grille were from the top-of the-line Sigma SE), and uprated suspension. The V3000 was available in basic Executive, mid-range Super Saloon, and top-of-the-range SEi trim levels, the latter with luxury trim and digital dashboard. Later a sports version Elante was introduced, based on the Executive. The V6 engine combined with relatively low weight and gearing ensured excellent performance, New Zealand's traffic patrol selected them as patrol cars to replace the turbocharged Sigma GSR. These police cars had the Elante suspension pack, which was an option on other models. For 1990, the V3000 was further updated and now featured the front styling of the Eterna hardtop. New Zealand was the only market where this restyling was applied to the fifth generation four-door sedan bodyshell. Assembly of this model continued until 1991, when it was replaced by the second-generation Australian Mitsubishi Magna TR V6 range, which continued to be known as V3000 for the New Zealand market.

=== Hardtop sedan ===
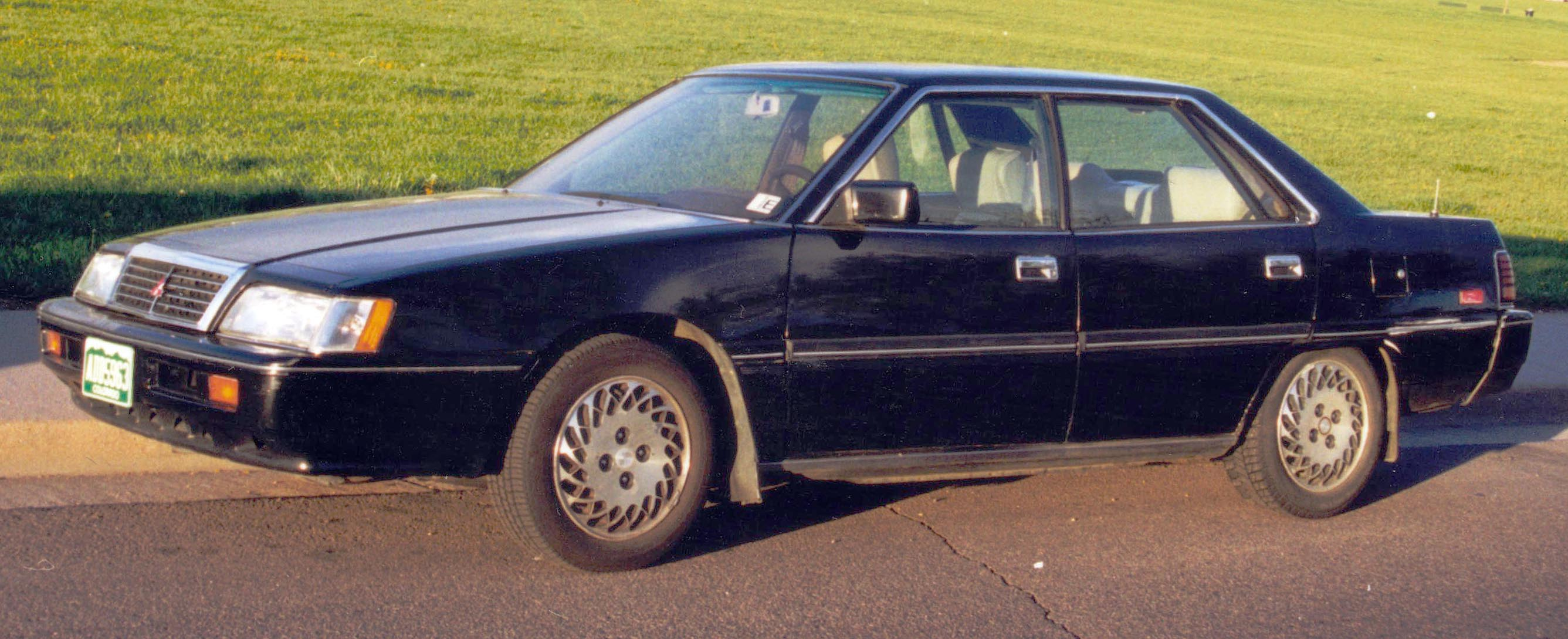
1990 Mitsubishi Sigma (US)

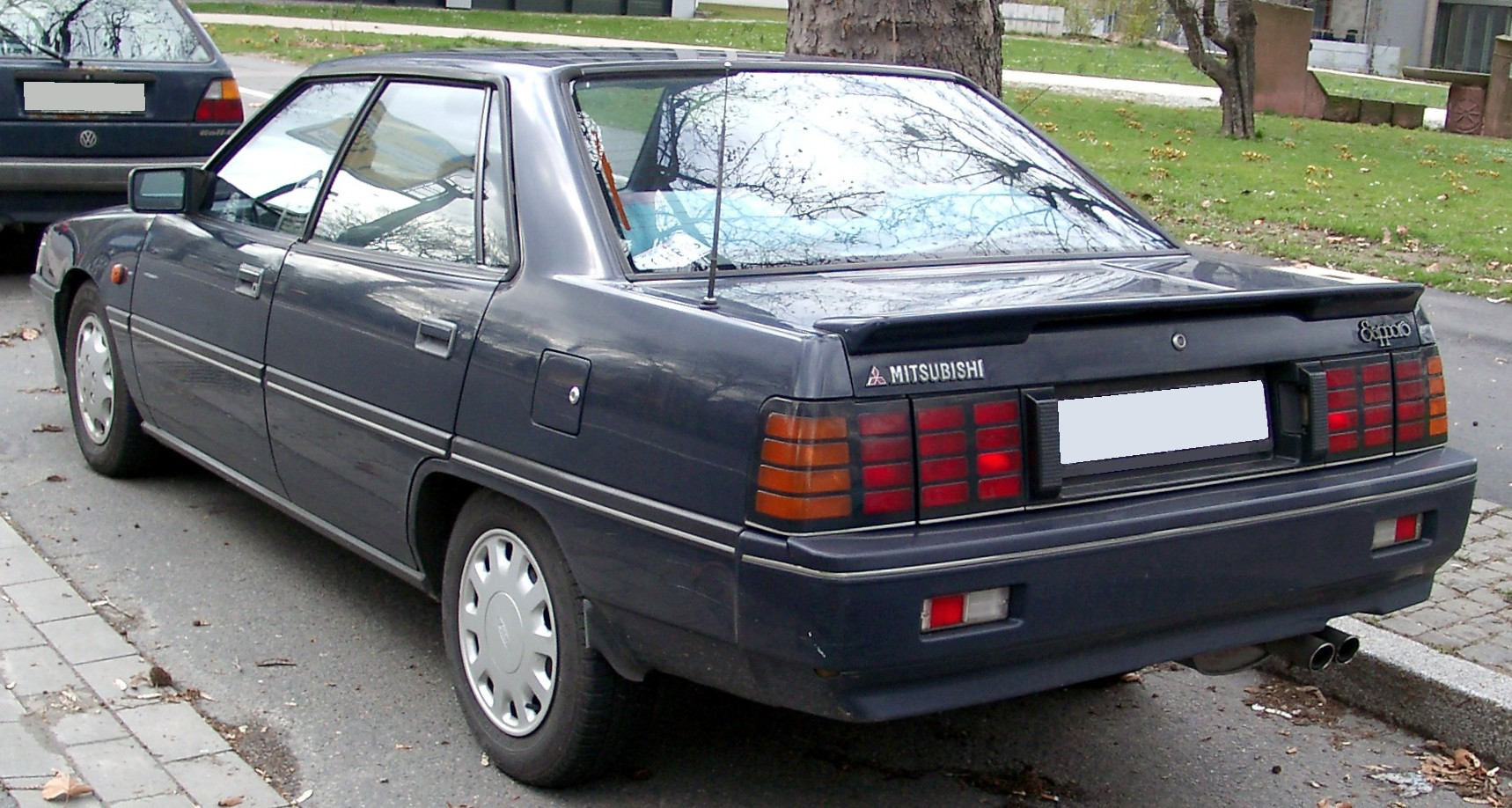
Mitsubishi Sapporo (Europe)

The hardtop sedan bodywork was used in export markets as well, where it received a six-window design unlike for its Japanese market counterparts. It was marketed under different names; "Galant Σ" or "Eterna Σ" (Sigma) in Japan, "Sapporo" in Europe, and in the US as "Galant Σ" (1988 model year) followed by plain "Sigma" (1989 to 1990 model years).

In the domestic Japanese market the hardtops received 2.0-litre fours, or the smaller 2.0-litre 6G71 V6 engine from 1986, shared with the Mitsubishi Debonair limousine. For the top-of-the-line VR models, an intercooled turbo-charged 4G63T "Sirius Dash 3x2" engine that automatically switched between two and three valves per cylinder depending upon throttle response and therefore allowing both economy and performance, was fitted, along with self-levelling suspension, climate-controlled air-conditioning, blue velour interior, steering wheel-controlled audio functions, and 15-inch alloy wheels. From 1985, this powerplant was renamed "Cyclone Dash 3x2". In European markets, the Sapporo was fitted with 2.4-liter, four-cylinder engines.

The hardtop range continued to be available until 1990 as Mitsubishi's most luxurious offering in most export markets, until the Sigma/Diamante replaced it. It also continued on sale in Japan, but only as the Eterna Sigma after a facelift in May 1989. In Japan the hardtop was available with a 1.8-liter four at the bottom of the range and with the large 3.0-liter V6 in the top "Duke" version after this makeover. The European market Sapporo took its bow at the 1987 Frankfurt Motor Show; the large 2.4-liter 4G64 "Sirius" four-cylinder producing 129 PS (95 kW) at 5,000 rpm (124 PS [91 kW] for the catalyzed version).

==== North America ====
In the United States, the "Galant Σ" was released for the 1988 model year. It was renamed the Mitsubishi Sigma in August 1988 for the 1989 model year; this version received updated alloy wheels and remained on sale through the 1990 model year. These cars were only available with a 3.0-liter V6 in North America, and only coupled with an automatic transmission. As the Sigma was a luxury version of the older Galant, it found few takers, especially since interior space was rather cramped even for four people. Interior headroom, already less than for the original Galant, was made even worse if the optional electrical glass sunroof was installed. Another unappreciated option was the Electronically Controlled Suspension (ECS); only available in a "Eurotech" package in combination with anti-lock brakes, this was described as "more high-tech frill than helpful function."

== Sixth generation (E30; 1987) ==
Sixth generation
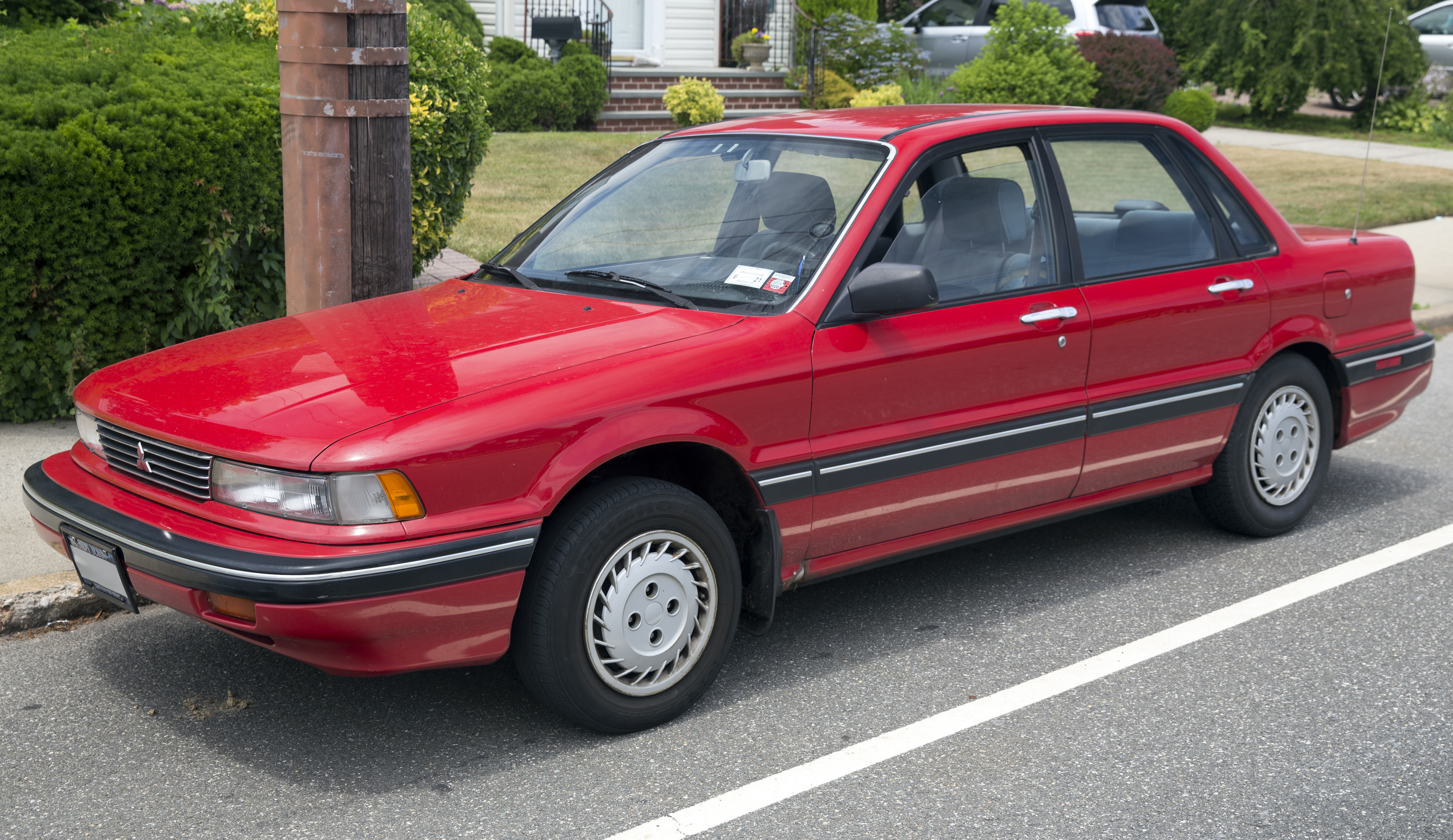
- Pre-facelift Mitsubishi Galant 2.0 sedan (US)

Overview
- Also called: Mitsubishi Eterna; Dodge 2000 GTX (Canada); Eagle 2000 GTX (Canada); Mitsubishi ZX/MF/MS/MX (Venezuela)
- Production: 1987–1994
- Designer: Shinichi Mitsuhashi

Body and chassis
- Class: Mid-size car
- Body style: 4-door sedan 4-door hardtop sedan 5-door hatchback
- Layout: Transverse front-engine, front-wheel-drive / all-wheel-drive
- Related: Mitsubishi Eclipse; Eagle Talon; Plymouth Laser

Powertrain
- Engine: 1597 cc 4G32 I4 (E31); 1755 cc 4G37 I4 (E32); 1836 cc 4G67 DOHC I4 (E35); 1997 cc 4G63 DOHC I4 (E33, E38); 1997 cc 4G63 turbo DOHC I4 (E39); 1795 cc 4D65T TD I4 (E34)
- Transmission: 4-speed automatic 5-speed manual

Dimensions
- Wheelbase: 2,600 mm (102.4 in)
- Length: 4,560 mm (179.5 in)
- Width: 1,695 mm (66.7 in)
- Height: 1,360 mm (53.5 in)

In October 1987 the same platform was used for a sixth-generation model which adopted taller, rounded styling. This generation won the Car of the Year Japan award in 1987 and the GS model became Motor Trend's Import Car of the Year in 1989. This Galant began American sales in 1989, side by side with the previous generation Sigma.

Mitsubishi developed Dynamic ECS adaptive air suspension, the world's first production semi-active electronically controlled suspension system in passenger cars; the system was first incorporated in the 1987 Galant model.

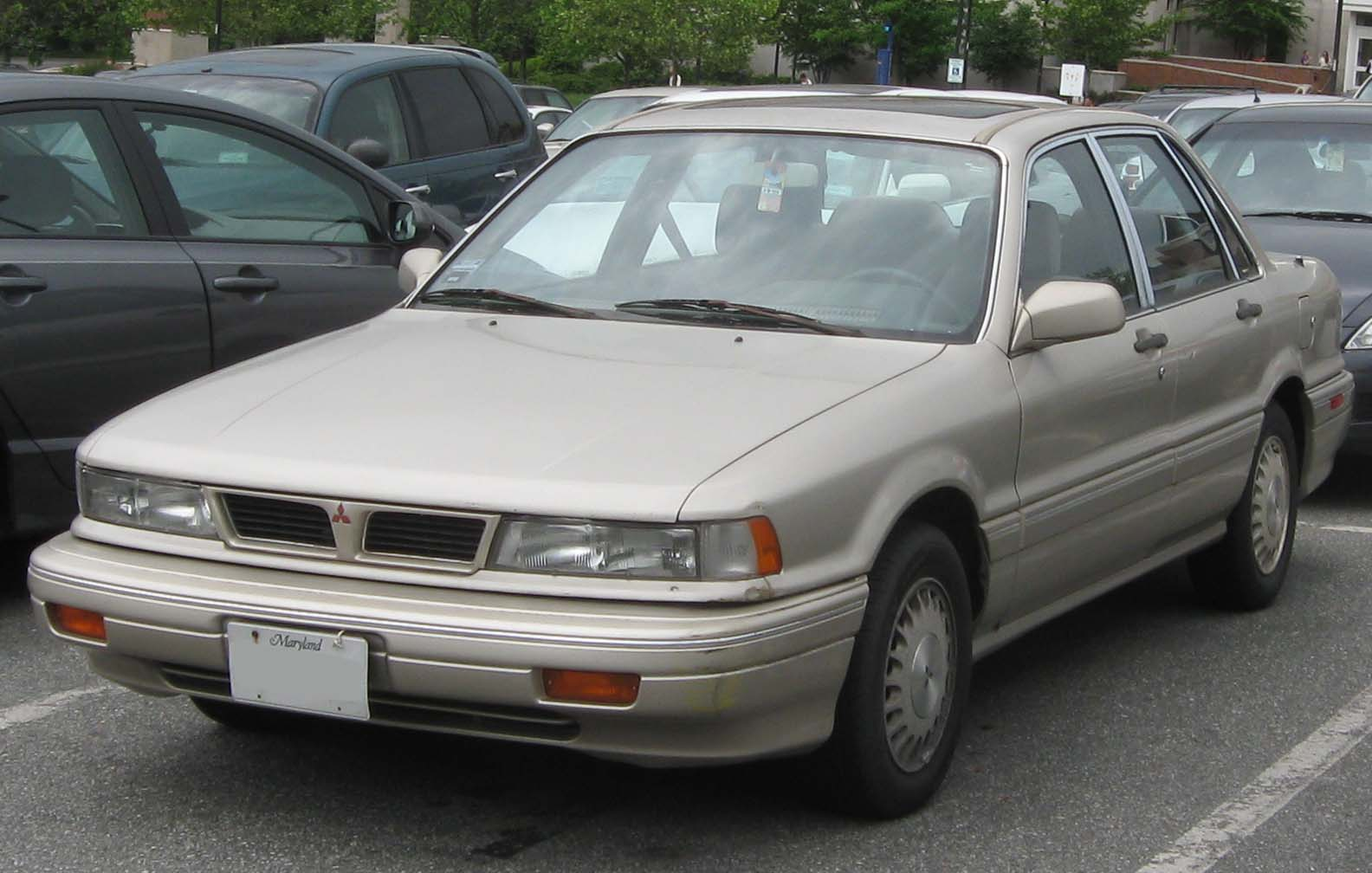
Facelifted Mitsubishi Galant sedan, US

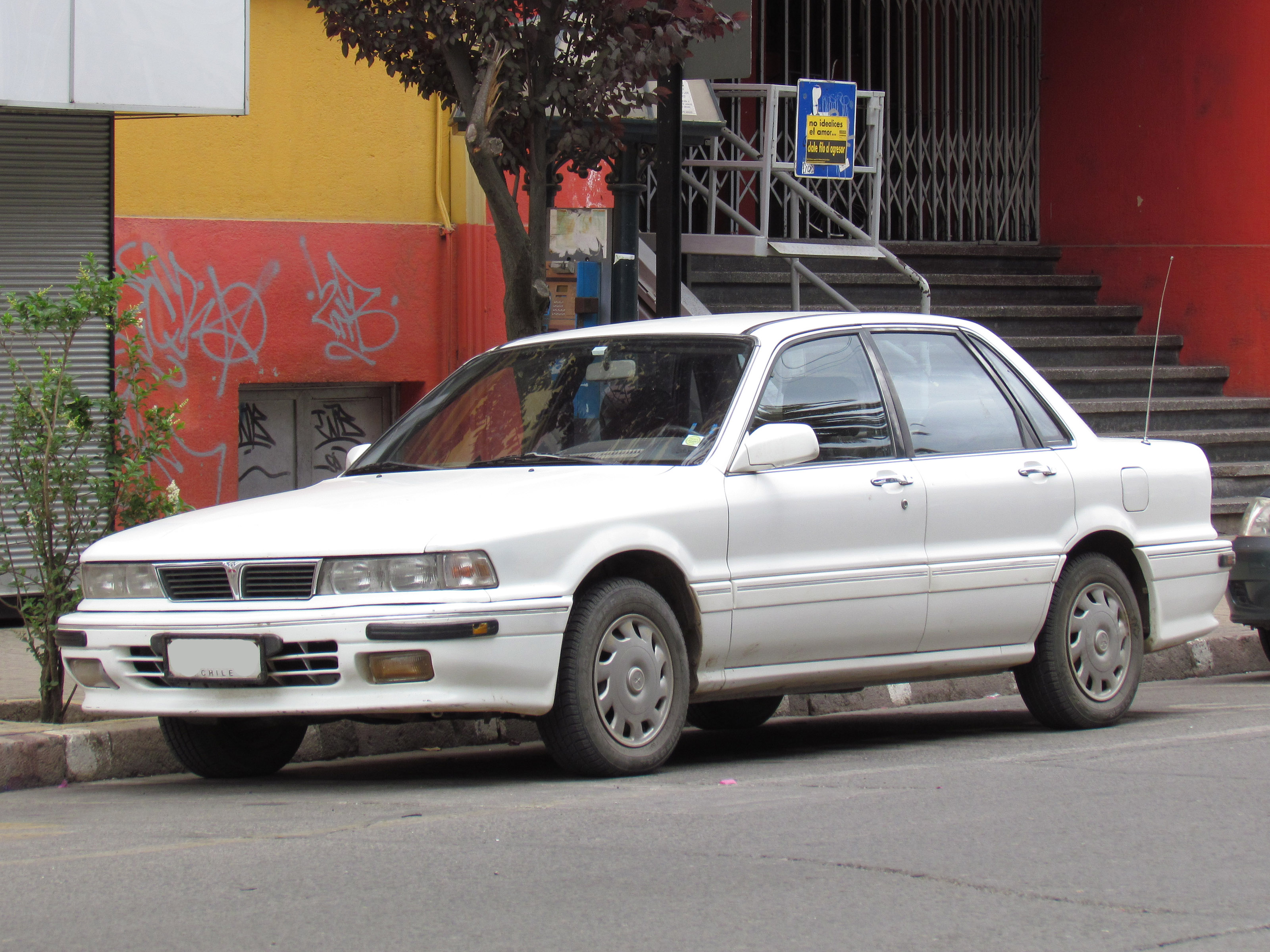
Facelifted Mitsubishi Galant Super Saloon, Latin America

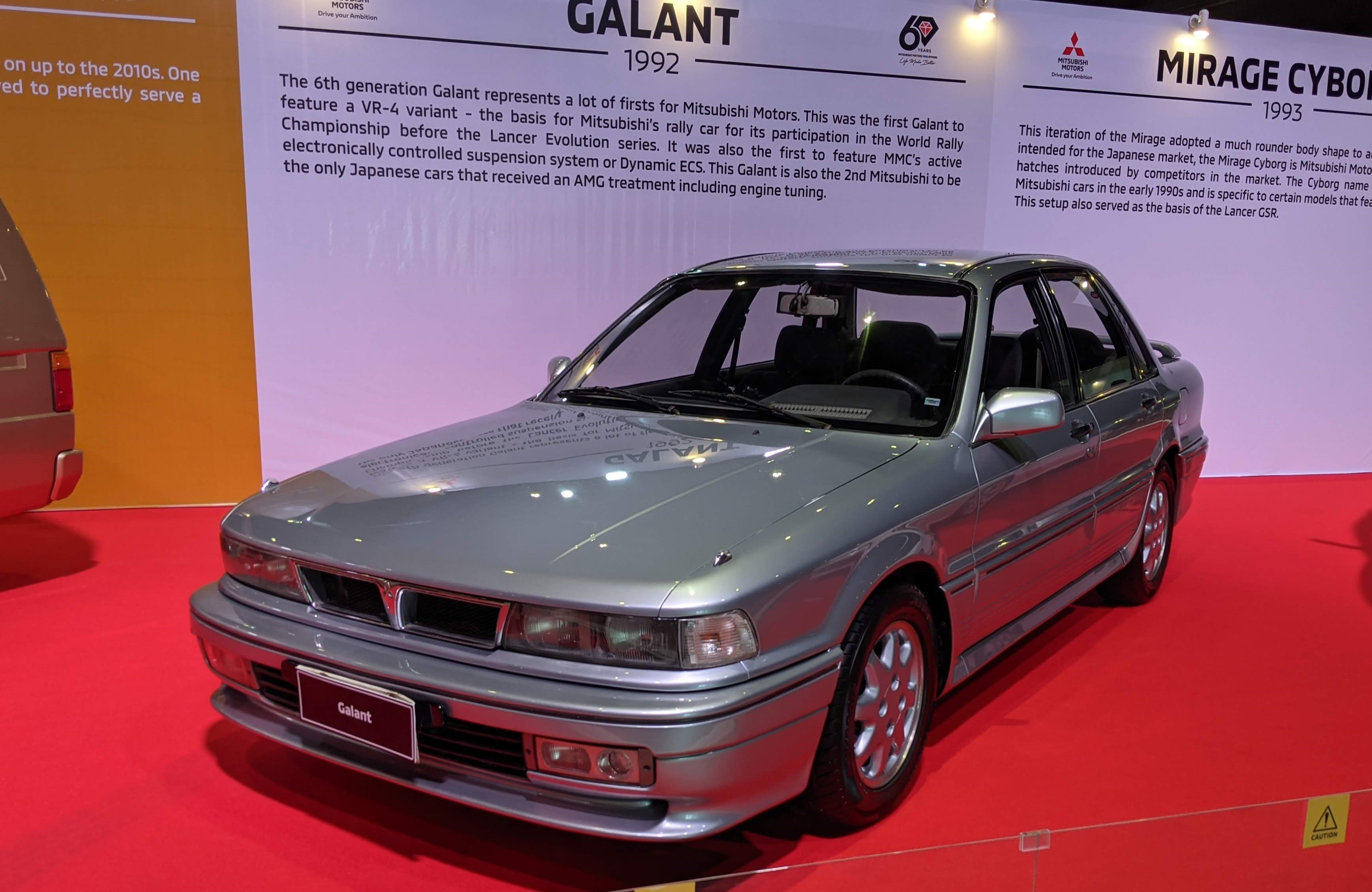
Facelifted Mitsubishi Galant GTi, Philippines

The Galant range underwent a minor facelift in 1991, with new grilles and other modifications. Also in 1991, Mitsubishi Motors Company completed a new assembly facility at Barcelona, Venezuela, with the Galant being one of the first models produced. It was sold there until 1994 under the ZX, MF, MS and MX names, which identified the various levels of equipment and transmission.

The Sigma designation disappeared with the 1990 model. A new hardtop liftback model was added in 1988, called the (Japanese: Mitsubishi Eterna). and in Japan, the Eterna was only sold at a specific retail chain called Car Plaza. This generation Galant was also sold in Canada as the Dodge 2000 GTX and Eagle 2000 GTX. The five-door liftback version was never offered in North America, where buyers prefer traditional sedans. In most of the world, the sixth generation Galant was replaced towards the end of 1992, but North American sales only ended in 1994, when the next generation Galant arrived there.

A limited edition based on the GTi-16v model was introduced in 1989, modified by German tuning company AMG (owned by Mercedes-Benz since 1999), with mildly uprated engine (170 PS or 125 kW or 168 hp) and unique body kit, alloy wheels, and full leather interior. The AMG appearance treatment was also achieved on the Debonair for 1986. It, along with the Debonair and Honda Ballade, were the only Japanese cars that received the AMG treatment.

In New Zealand, this generation took over from the Sigma as MMNZ's mid-size offering. It was launched in June 1988, initially in GL (1.6L), GLX (1.8L), Super Saloon and SE (both 2.0L) trim levels. These were assembled in Porirua at the MMNZ plant.

In the Philippines, the sixth generation Galant replaced the fourth generation model that was sold until 1987. Sales began in 1988 and ended in 1993, with trim models including a base 1.8L Super Saloon model (4G37 SOHC 8V engine producing 92hp, with a carburetor and no fog lamps), a 2.0L Super Saloon (4G63 SOHC 16V engine producing 115hp, with EFI, revised exterior and fog lamps) and a 2.0L GTi trim (4G63 DOHC 16V engine producing 145hp, rear disc brakes and a Ralliart body kit).

The sixth generation was also the first to see the introduction of the VR-4 variant, which was the basis for Mitsubishi's participation in the 1988–1992 World Rally Championships. The Galant's 4G63 two-litre DOHC turbocharged engine and 4WD transmission was later adopted for the Mitsubishi Lancer Evolution with little modification and would remain in production for fifteen years. Starting in 1989, the Mitsubishi Galant V-series were produced for the Japanese market as a sporty alternative to the regular Galant range. The lineup consisted of Viento and VX-S/VZ-S models featuring the higher output 1.8 and 2.0 Turbo DOHC engines with both automatic and manual transmissions available. The V-series featured the VR-4 interior, exterior design and updated bumpers (without side skirts), clear indicator lens covers, optional two-tone body paint, as well as standard air conditioning, full electrics, rear windscreen wiper, spoiler and alloy wheels. Fans sometimes call this car the "Evo Zero" but this was never more than a nickname as the Evolution series is Lancer-based.

Safety

National Highway Traffic Safety Administration (NHTSA) crash test ratings for 1991–1992 Galant:

- Frontal Driver:
- Frontal Passenger:
- Side Driver:
- Side Rear Passenger:
- Rollover:
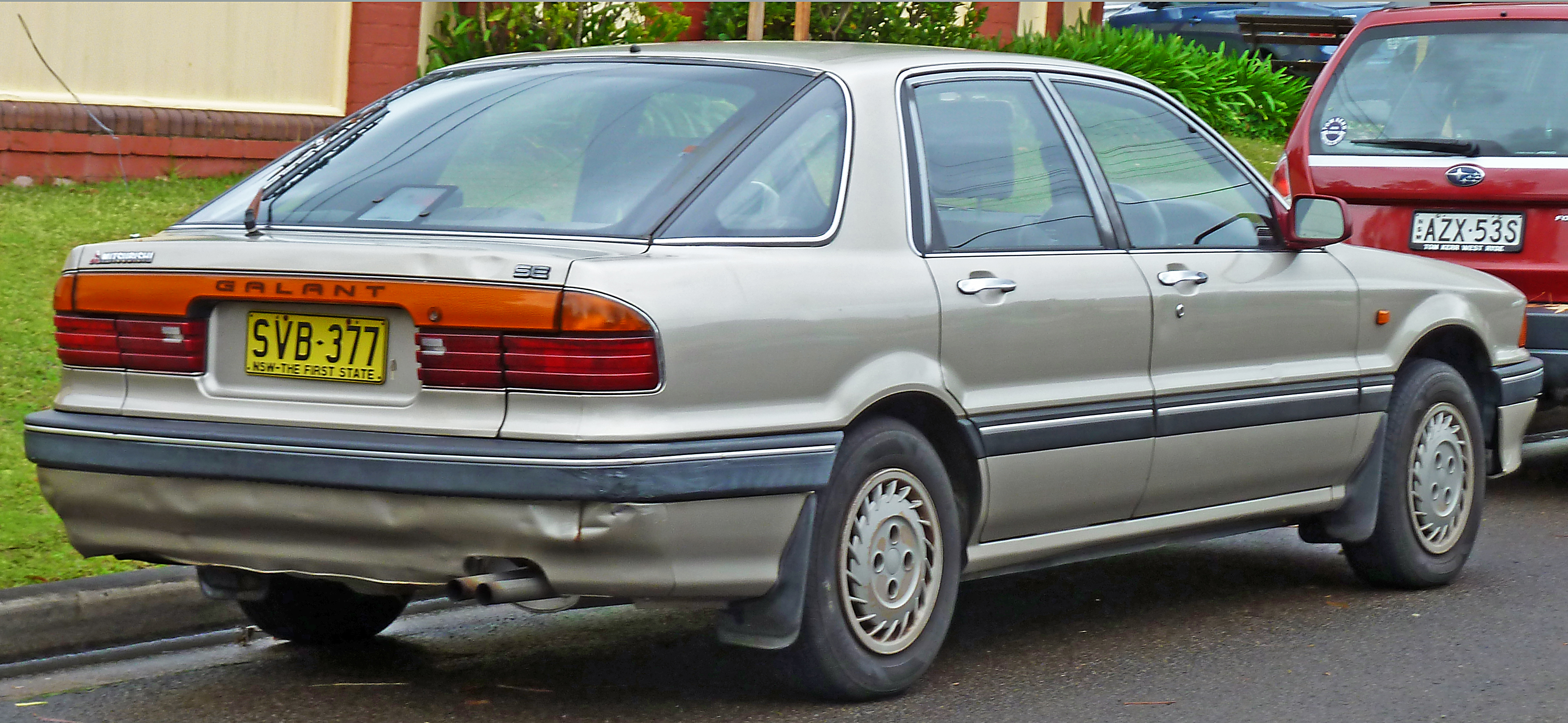
Mitsubishi Galant SE hatchback, Australia

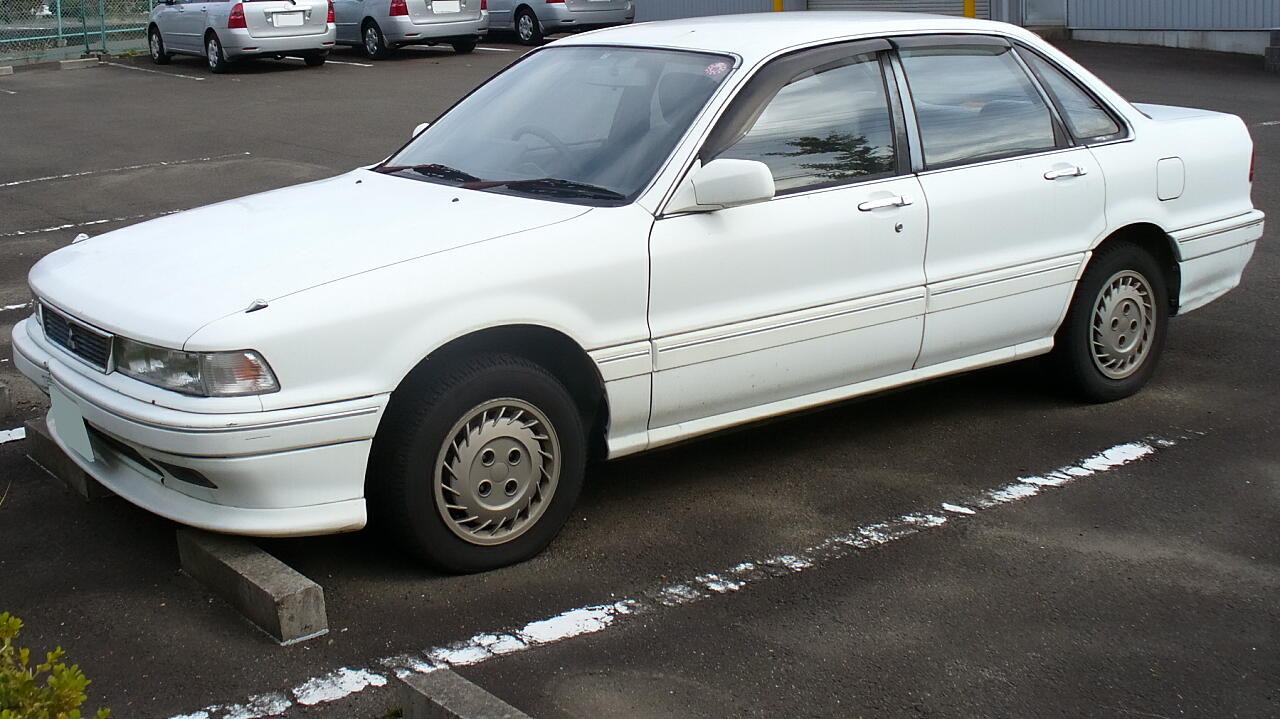
Mitsubishi Eterna Sava hardtop sedan, Japan

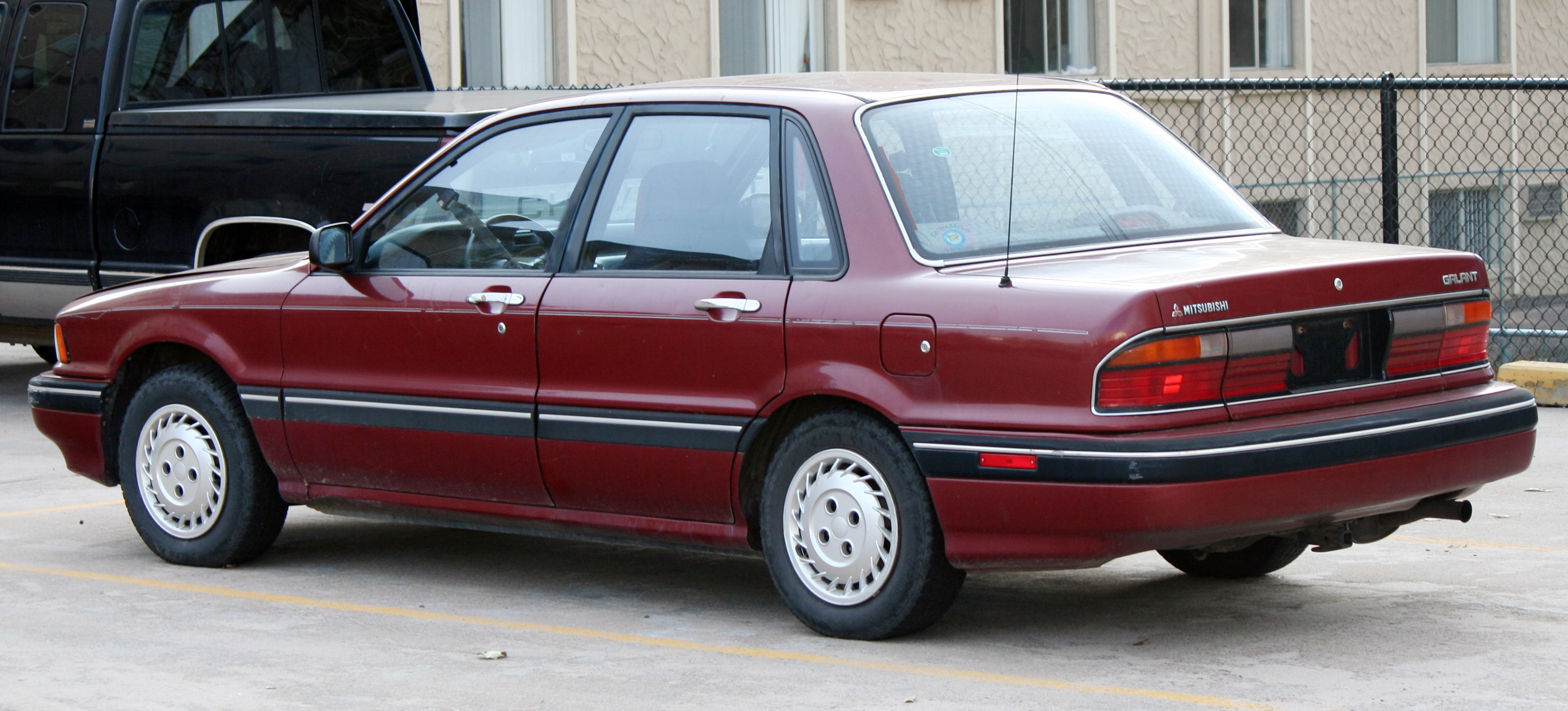
Rear view of 1990 Galant sedan, US

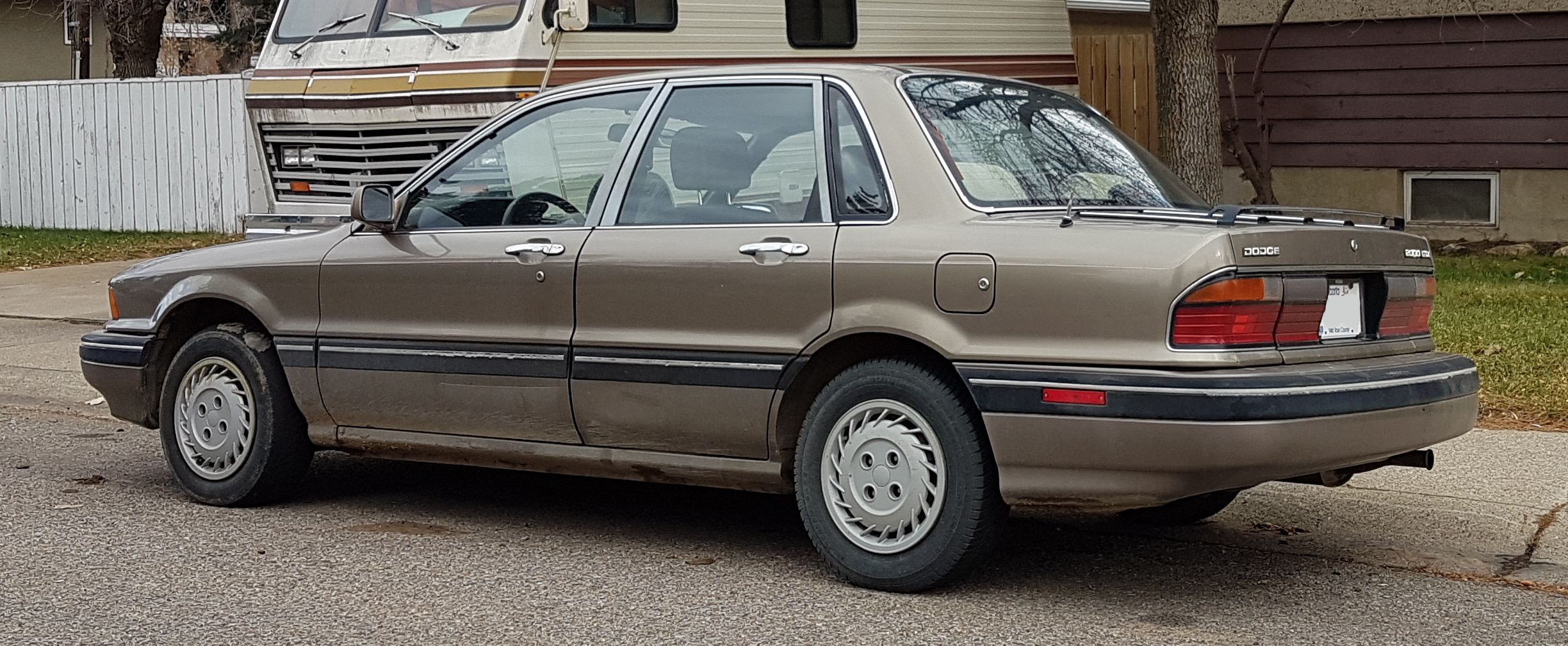
Dodge 2000 GTX, Canada

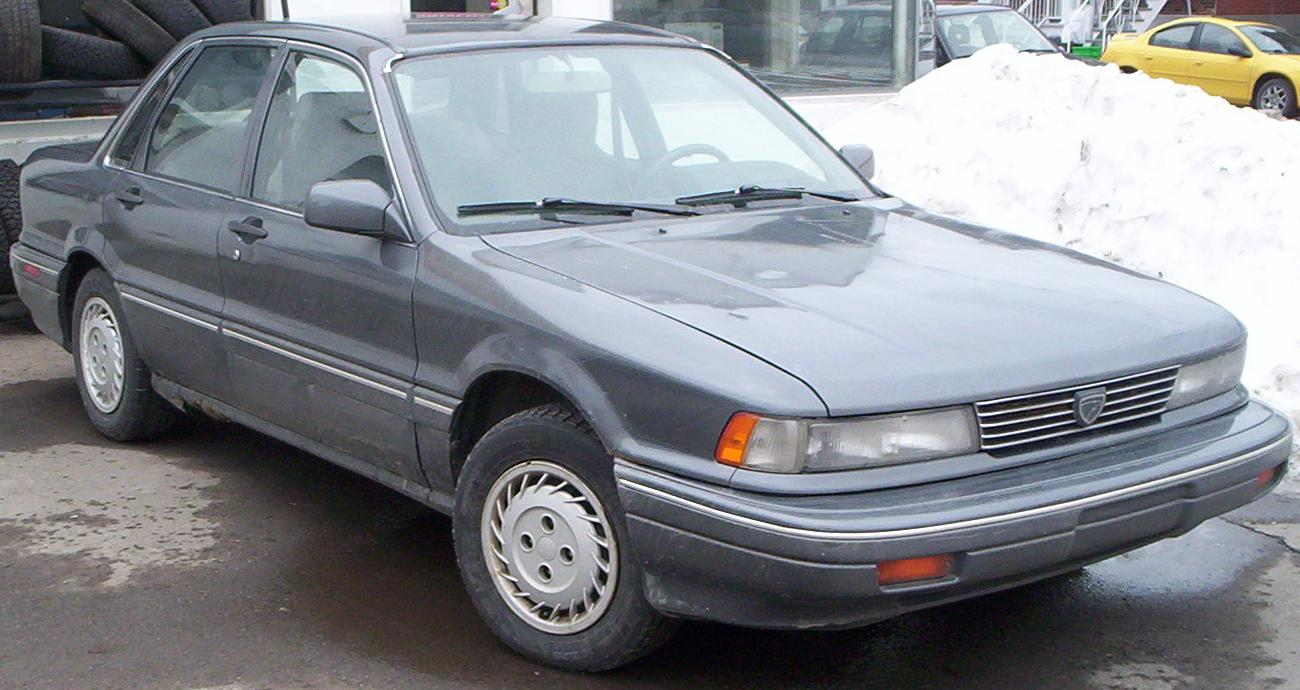
Eagle 2000 GTX, Canada

== Seventh generation (E50/60/70/80; 1992) ==
Seventh generation
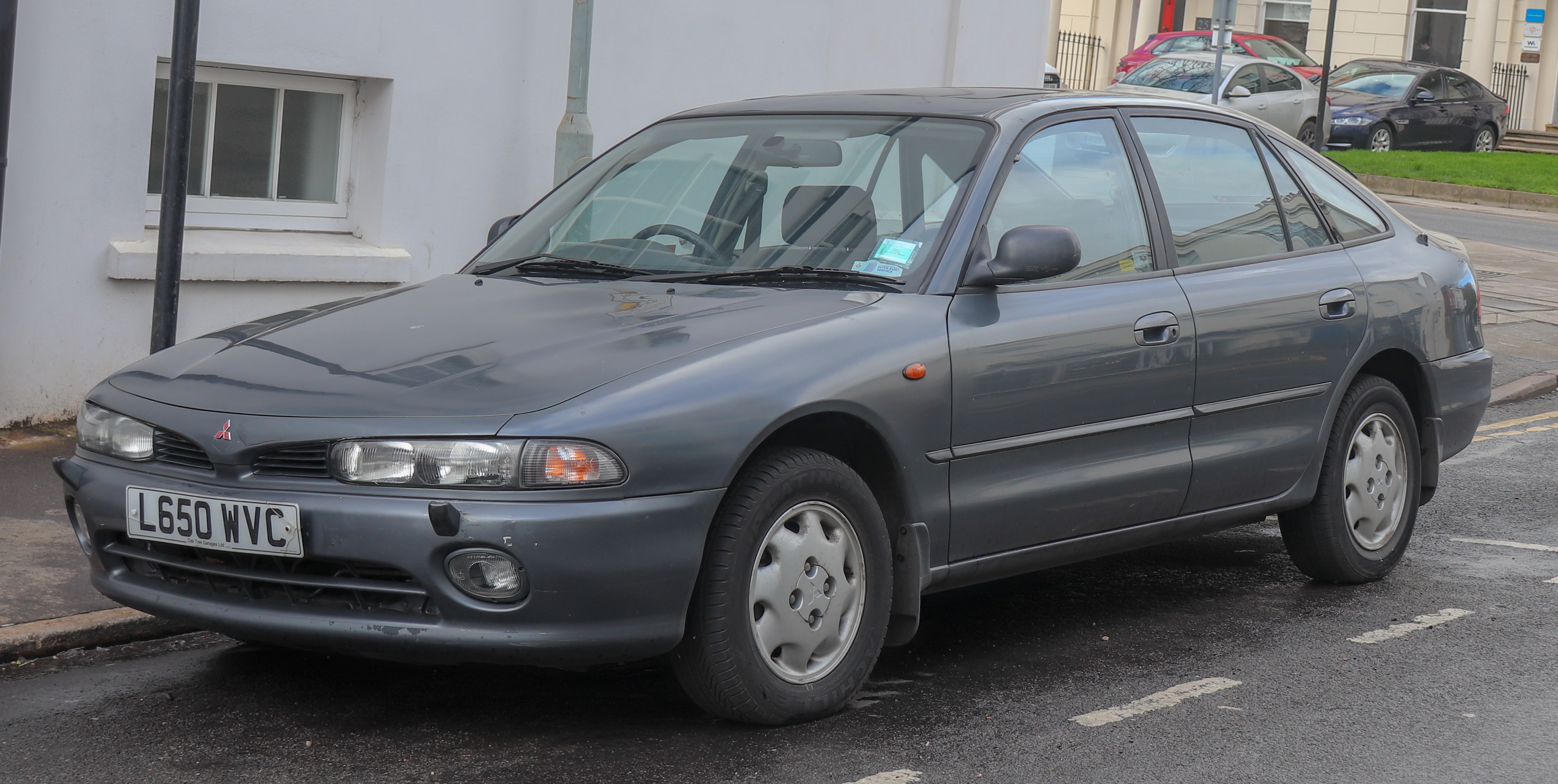
- Pre-facelift Mitsubishi Galant 2.0 GLSi liftback (E55A, UK)

Overview
- Production: 1992–1998
- Assembly: Japan: Nagoya plant, Okazaki, Aichi; United States: Normal, Illinois (DSM); Philippines: Cainta (MMPC); Thailand: Laem Chabang (MMTh); Indonesia: Pademangan, North Jakarta (KKM); New Zealand: Porirua, Wellington

Body and chassis
- Class: Mid-size car
- Body style: 4-door sedan; 4-door hardtop sedan (Emeraude); 5-door liftback
- Layout: Front-engine, front-wheel-drive; four-wheel-drive
- Related: Mitsubishi Eterna; Mitsubishi Emeraude; Proton Perdana

Powertrain
- Engine: 1.8 L 4G93 I4 SOHC (E52A/E72A); 1.8 L 6A11 V6 (E53A); 2.0 L 4G63 I4 SOHC (E55A); 2.0 L 6A12 V6 SOHC/DOHC (E54A/E64A); 2.0 L 6A12TT twin turbo V6 (E74A/E84A); 2.4 L 4G64 I4 SOHC/DOHC (E56A); 2.5 L 6G73 V6 DOHC (E88A); 2.0 L 4D68 turbodiesel I4 (E57A/E77A)
- Transmission: 5-speed manual; 4-speed INVECS automatic

Dimensions
- Wheelbase: 2,635 mm (103.7 in)
- Length: 4,625–4,640 mm (182.1–182.7 in)
- Width: 1,730 mm (68.1 in)
- Height: 1,395–1,400 mm (54.9–55.1 in)
- Curb weight: 1,250 kg (2,756 lb); 1,430 kg (3,153 lb) (VR-4)

Chronology
- Successor: Mitsubishi Carisma (Europe)

A new Galant debuted in September 1992 at the Tokyo Motor Show (1994 model year in the US), originally only available as a four-door sedan (which was the only model to be sold in the US). A five-door liftback derivative made its world premiere at the February 1993 Dutch Motor Show. A Japan-only hardtop derivative called the (Japanese: Emeraude) (French for emerald) was also launched in 1992. The width dimensions of the model sold in Japan no longer complied with Japanese government dimension regulations for compact cars, placing it in a higher tax bracket.

In Japan, the Galant was offered with a variety of engine options, namely the 1.8 L 4G93 (SOHC) and 2.0 L 4D68 turbodiesel four-cylinder engines, as well as several V6 engines such as the 1.8 L 6A11, 2.0 L 6A12 (SOHC/DOHC) and 2.0 L 6A12TT twin turbo (VR-4). In October 1993, Mitsubishi introduced another sport model below the VR-4 model called "VX-R", offered a MIVEC version of the DOHC 2.0 L V6 engine, a high revving naturally aspirated engine with more aggressive tuning. This engine is also found on Mitsubishi's midsize sports car FTO's GP trim levels which introduced in 1994. Output was placed at 200 PS (147 kW; 197 hp) at 7500 rpm and 200 N⋅m (148 lb⋅ft) of torque at 6000 rpm, 30 PS (22 kW; 30 hp) and 14 N⋅m (10 lb⋅ft) more than the non-MIVEC DOHC "VX" version. A month later, a 5-door liftback body style was added to the line up. However, it was marketed as an "RV" (crossover) style rather than the conventional styling of the export models, similar to the Subaru Legacy SUS. It was only powered by two version of 2.0 L V6 engines, SOHC for base FWD model and VR-4's twin turbo engine for the "GT" AWD model

This generation marked a substantial change in suspension design. The front switched from struts to a multi-link structure featuring two lower arms and one upper arm. The rear switched from a beam axle to a newly designed multi-link system. This was the world's first 4-wheel multi-link suspension in an FF car. Both designs would carry over to the second generation Mitsubishi Eclipse and its sister vehicles.

The facelifted model appeared in October 1994 with new front bumper, taillights and the revised version of the 1.8 L 4G93 engine with fuel injection and DOHC cylinder head. The Galant Sports liftback was discontinued in November 1995, due to a lack of demand.

=== VR-4 ===
For 1992, the emergence of the homologated Lancer Evolution meant that the top-spec Galant VR-4 was no longer constrained by sporting regulations. The new generation thus became a less overtly competition oriented vehicle. The existing, proven 4WD transmission was carried over, in keeping with Mitsubishi's reputation for performance-enhancing technology, but the old inline-four was superseded by a smoother twin-turbo 2.0-litre V6, and mated either to a conventional five-speed manual, or a four-speed INVECS auto complete with "fuzzy logic", which allowed the transmission to adapt to the driver's style and road conditions "on the fly". It was capable of accelerating from 0–60 mph (97 km/h) in about 6.5 seconds, and if derestricted could reach about 140 mph (225 km/h).

Variants of the VR-4 using the same engine and drivetrain were sold in Japan as the Eterna XX-4 (1992) and Galant Sports GT liftback.

=== Export ===
Production in the United States began on 24 May 1993 when the first seventh generation Galant rolled off the assembly line in Normal, Illinois. The North American Galant was initially only available with two version of 2.4 L 4G64 four cylinder engines, SOHC 141 hp (105 kW; 143 PS) for "S, ES and LS" models and DOHC 160 hp (119 kW; 162 PS) version exclusively for the top model "GS". The GS is equipped with speed-sensitive steering and rear stabilizer bar as standard. From 1995 model year, the GS DOHC model was dropped from the line up. The Galant received a facelift for the 1996 model year with a new front bumper.

In Europe were also available a "GTi" model with 170 PS (125 kW; 168 hp) naturally aspirated 2.5 L 6G73 24-valve DOHC engine, which was mounted with four-wheel drive, 5-speed manual transmission and four-wheel-steering. Four cylinders 1.8 L, 2.0 L 4G63 (SOHC), 2.0 turbodiesel engines as well as 2.0 L V6 engine and all-wheel drive options were also in this market. Body styles were four-door sedan and five-door liftback. Rear differential was not available with limited-slip. In option were sunroof, A/C, cruise control, power windows, central locking, electrical heated seats and electrical side-mirrors.

In Asia such as in the Philippines, Thailand and Indonesia, the seventh generation Galant sedan was appeared in late 1993. It was offered in 2 grades: VR and top-spec Super Saloon. There were 2 engine choices offered: the 2.0 L four cylinder SOHC carbureted 16-valve 4G63 engine mated to a 5-speed manual for the VR or a 2.0 L non-Mivec DOHC V6 engine mated to either a 5-speed manual or a 4-speed automatic. The V6 engine was rated at 150 PS (110 kW; 148 hp), same as the European version. The four cylinder engine was updated with fuel injection for the facelifted model. Indonesia received the facelift in 1997, the facelift only lasted for a year, making the facelifted 7th generation Galant a rare sight in Indonesia.

Safety

National Highway Traffic Safety Administration (NHTSA) crash test ratings for 1997 and 1998 Galant:

- Frontal driver:
- Frontal passenger:
- Side driver:
- Side rear passenger:
- Rollover:
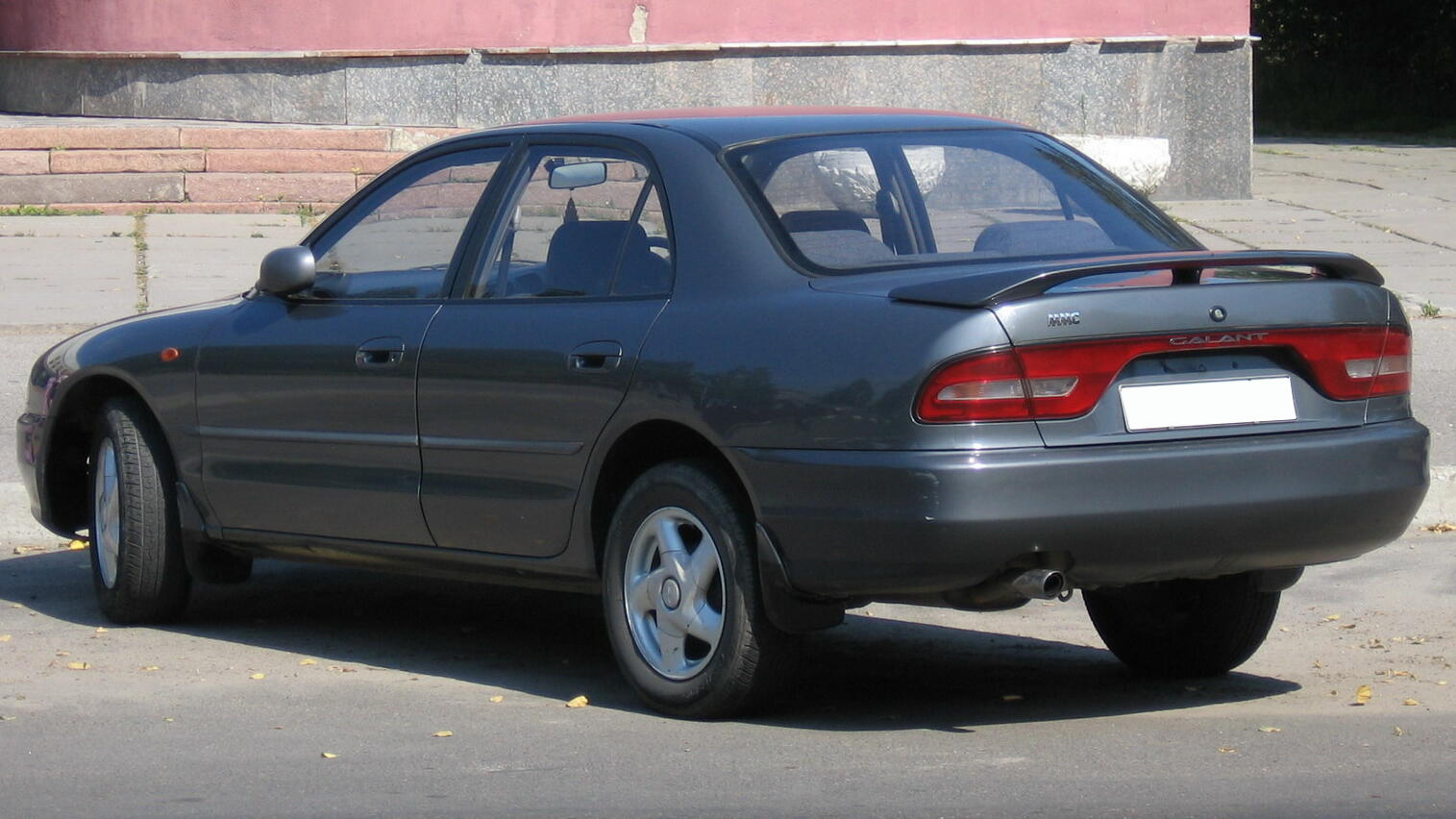
Sedan

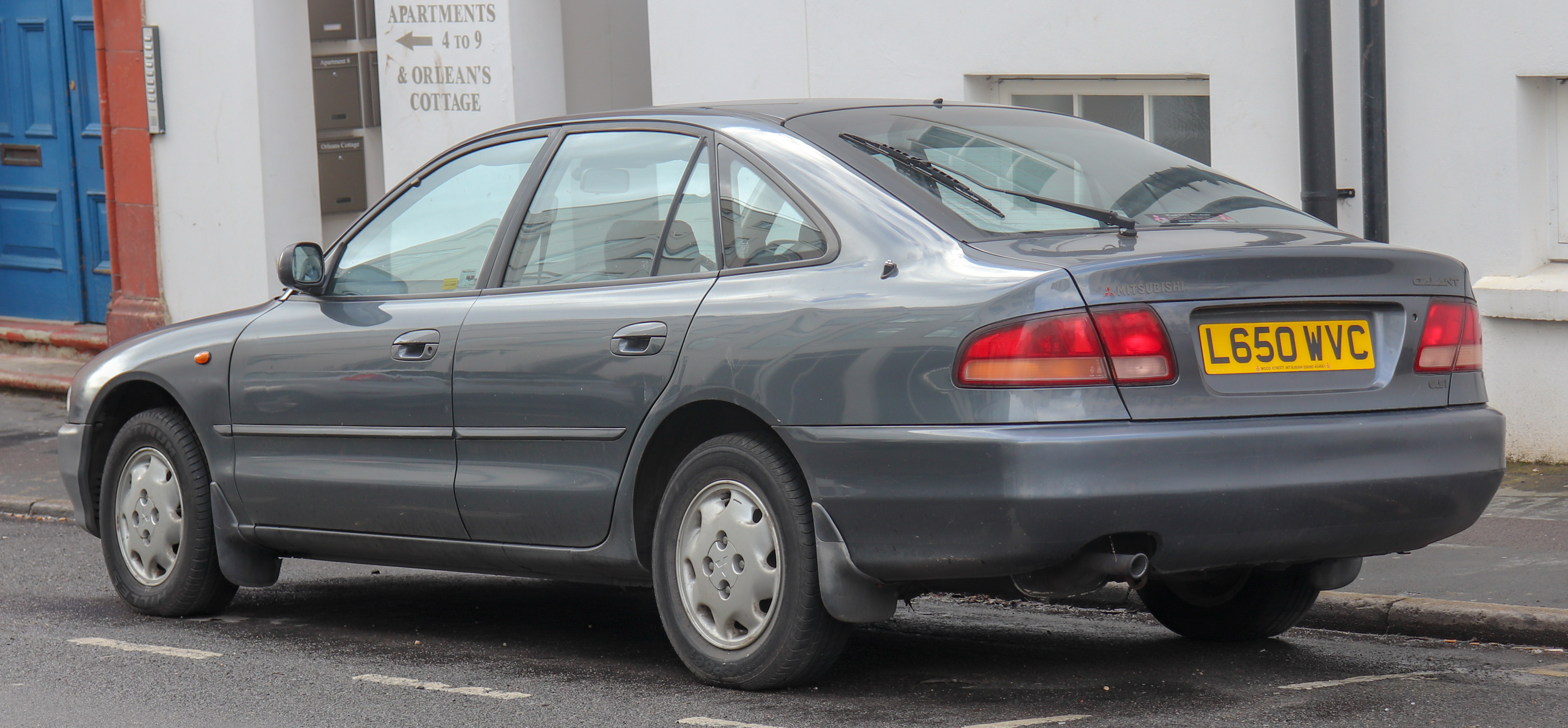
Liftback

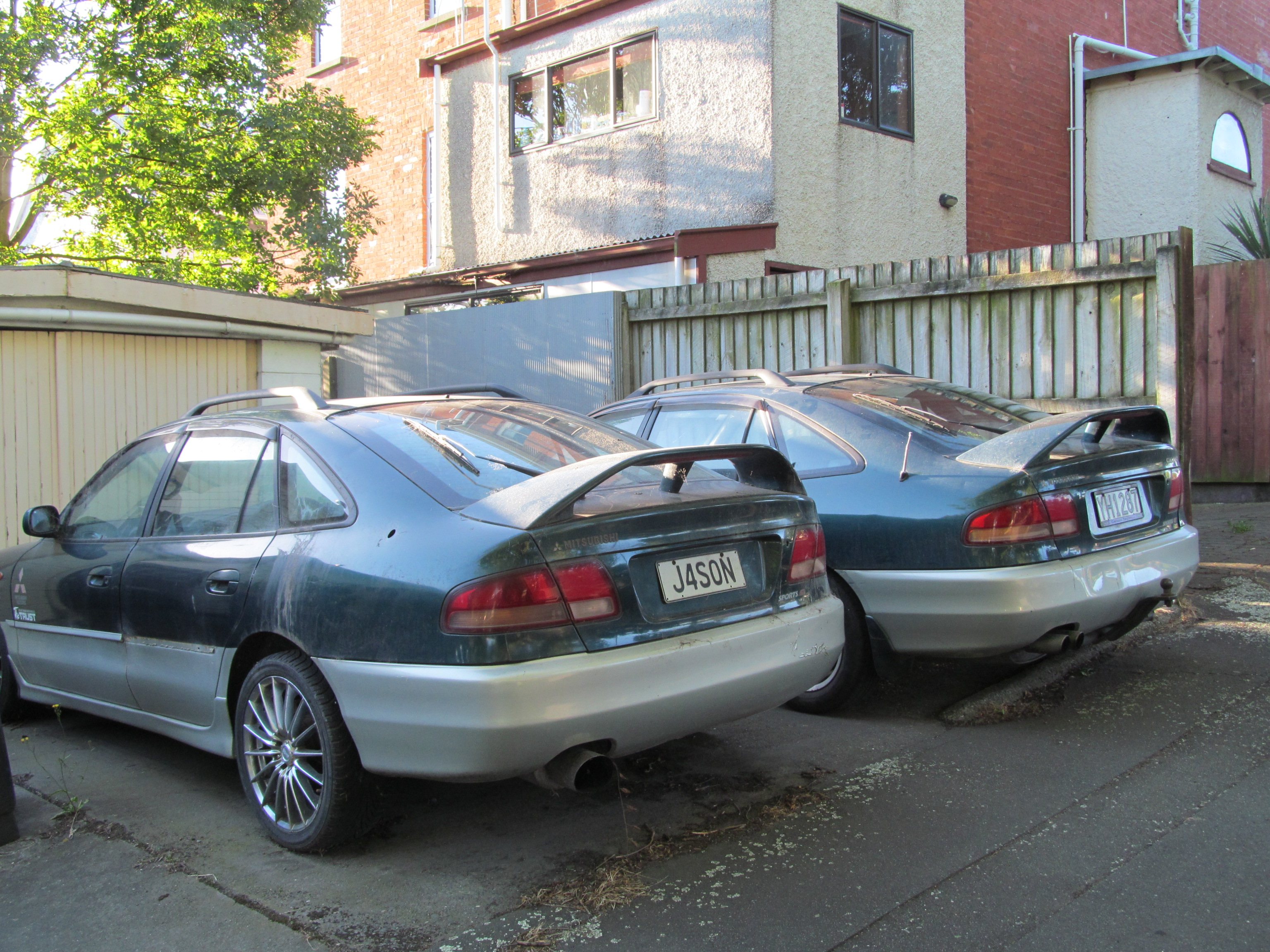
Galant Sports lifback

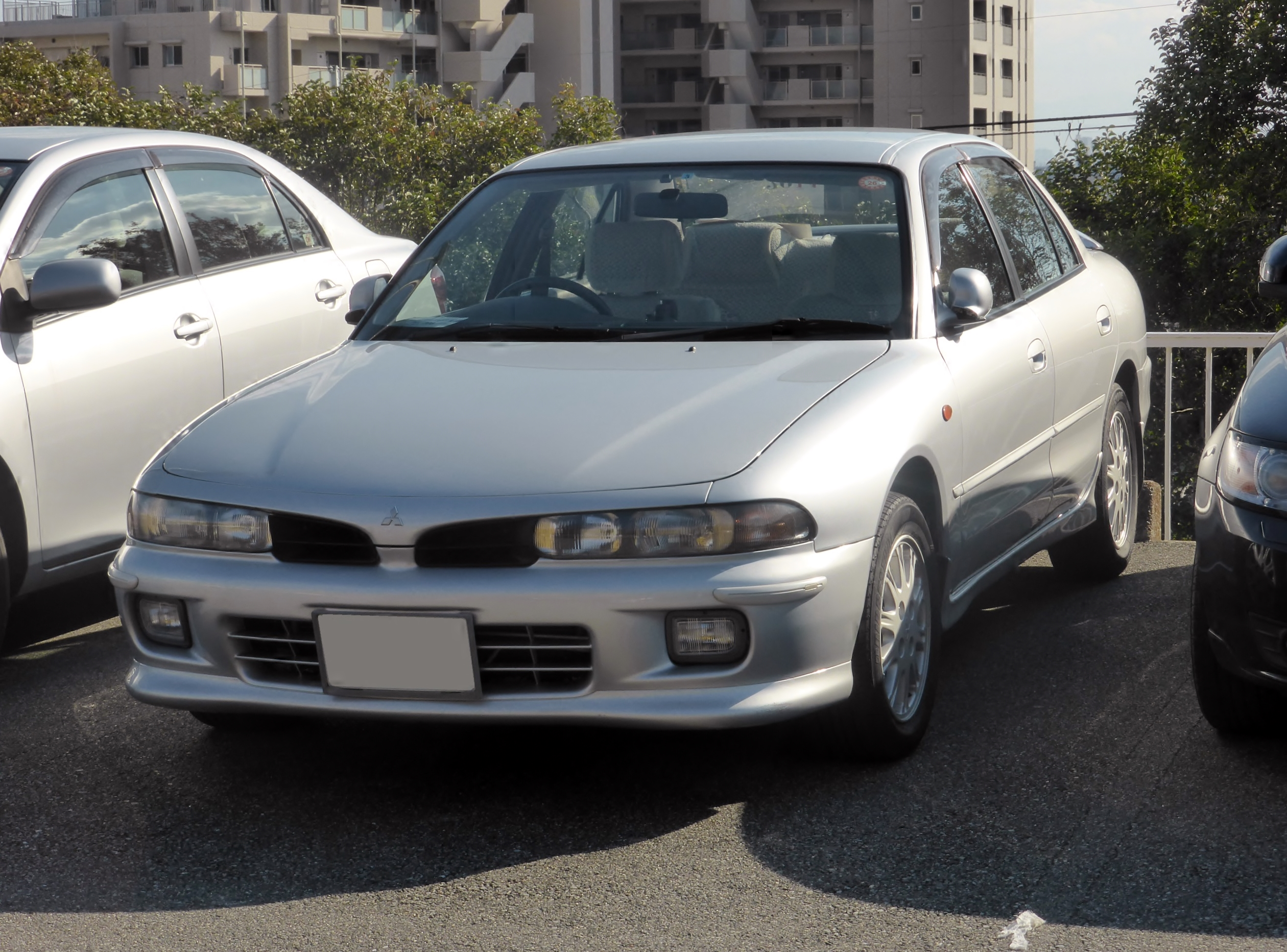
Facelift

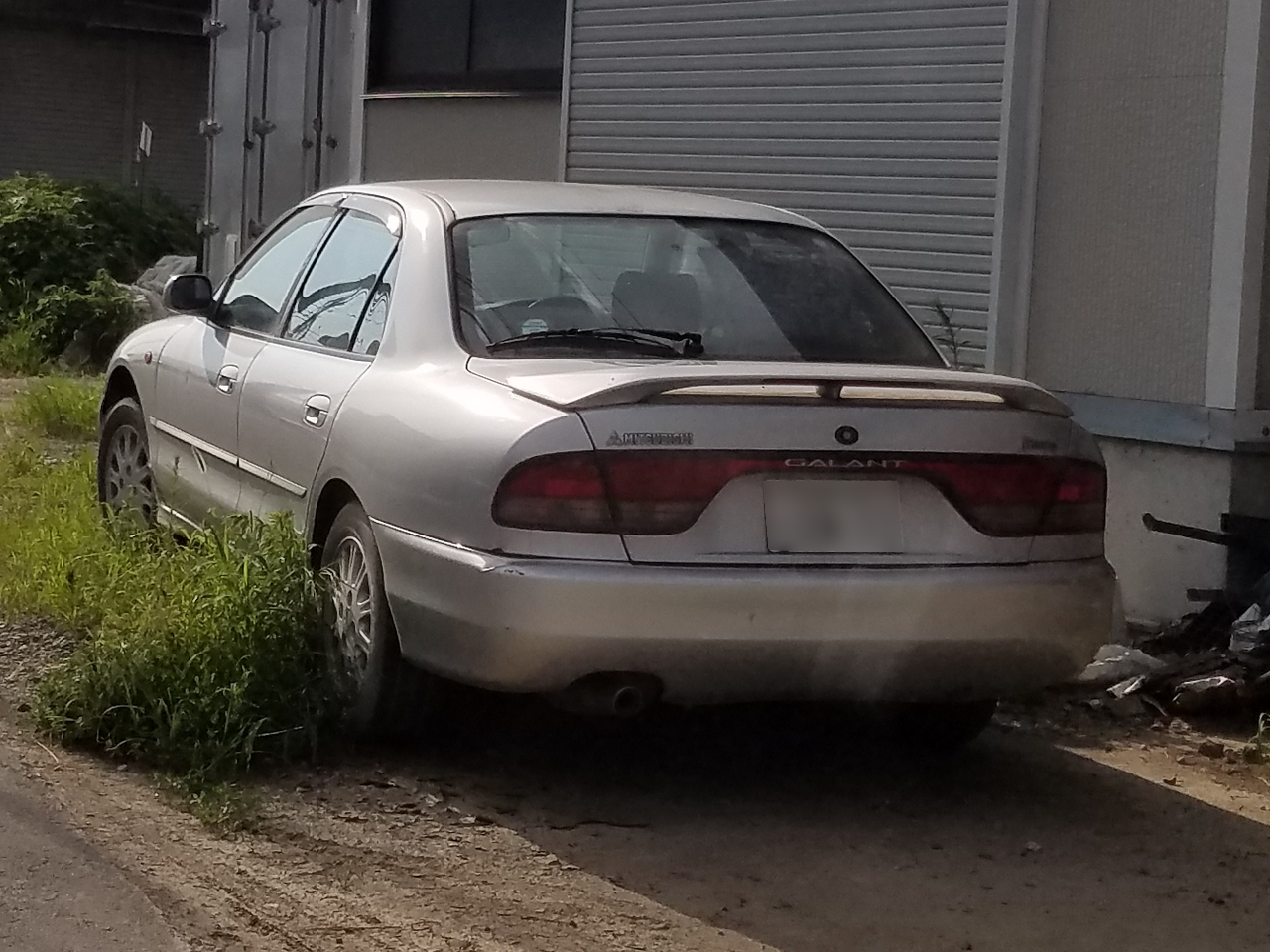
Facelift

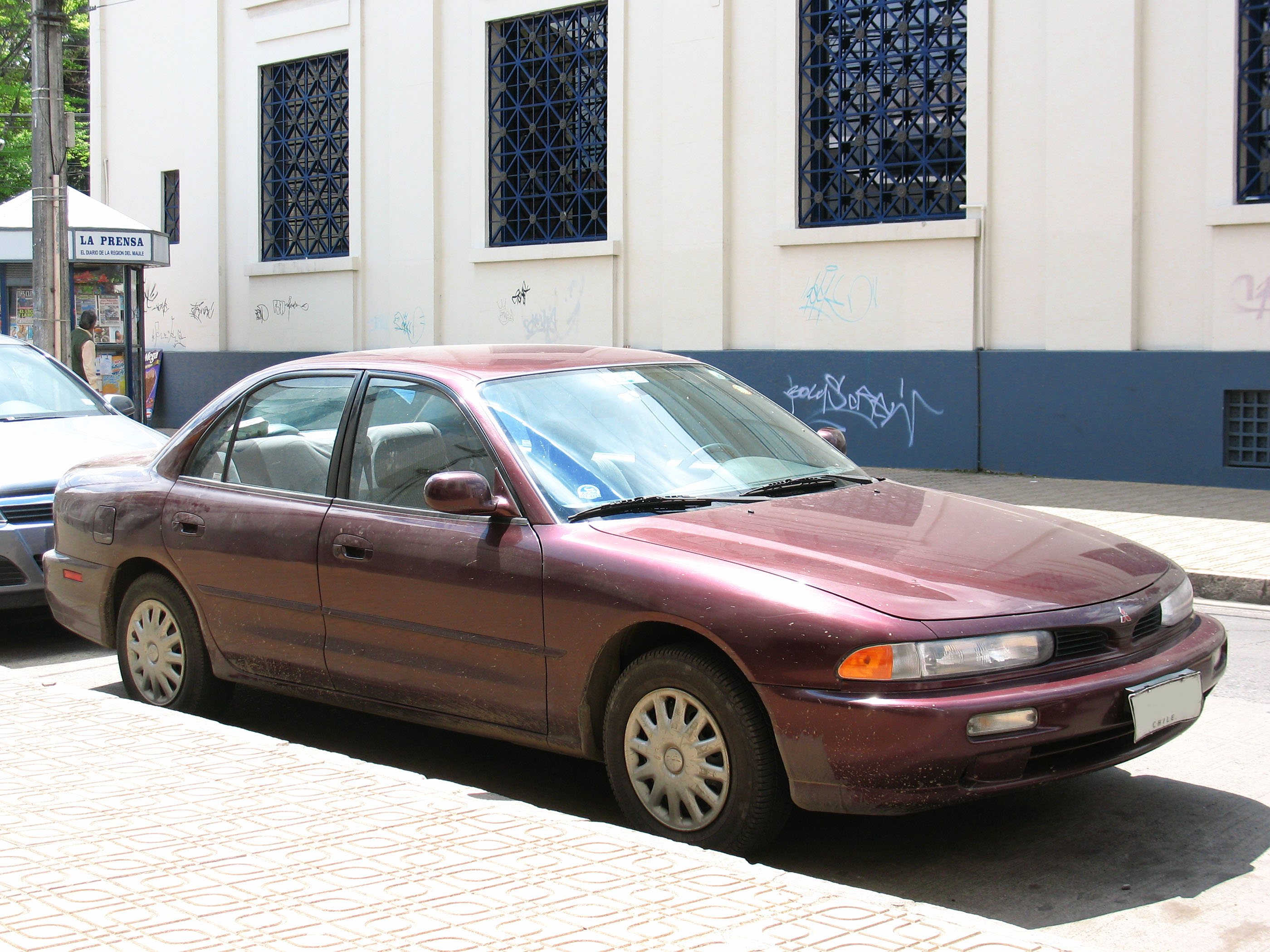
1994–1997 Galant (US)

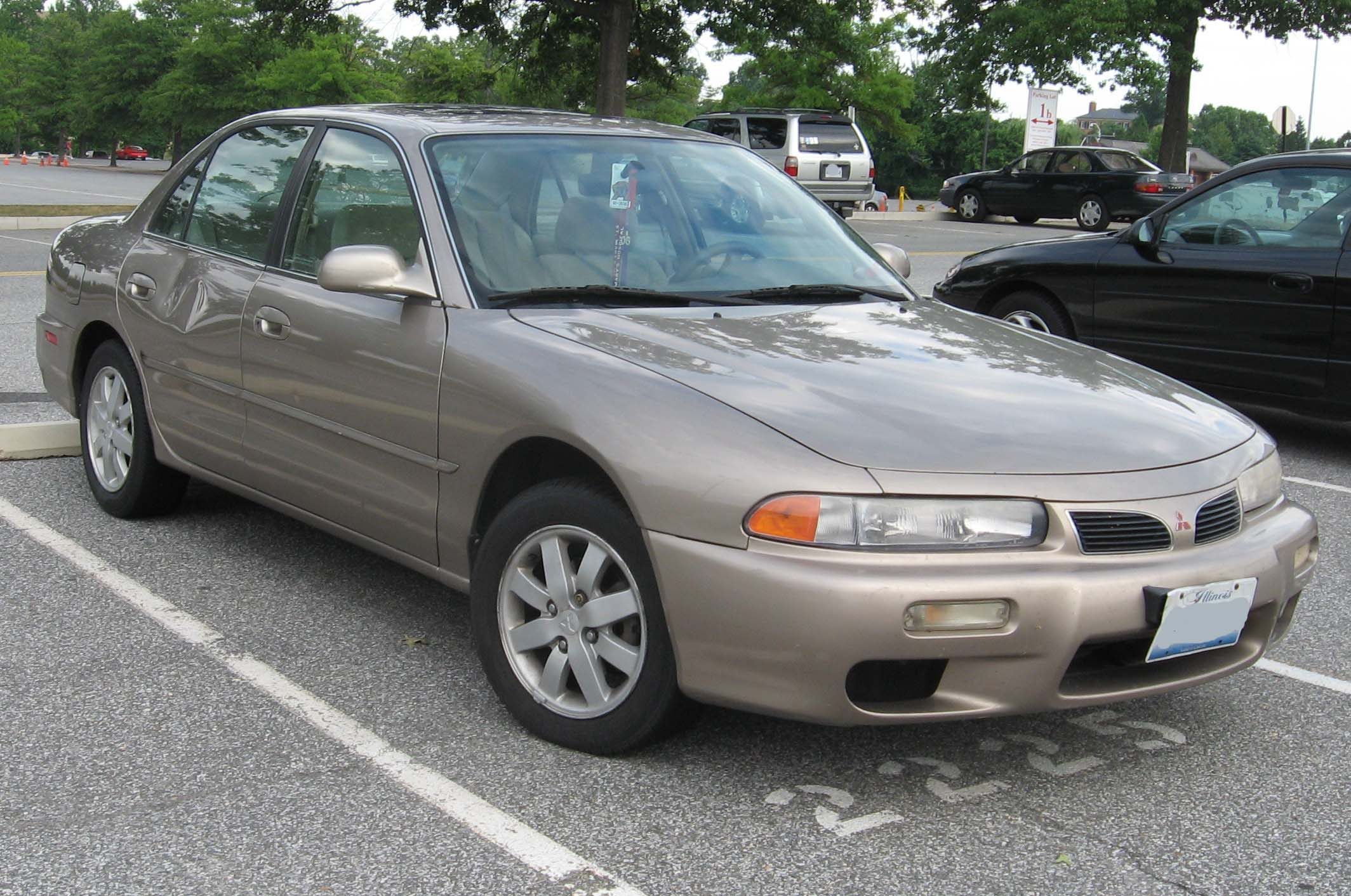
1997–1998 Galant (US)

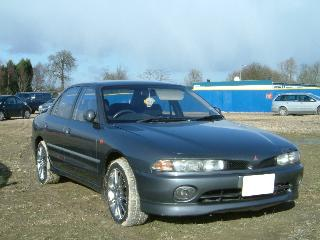
1993 Galant VR-4

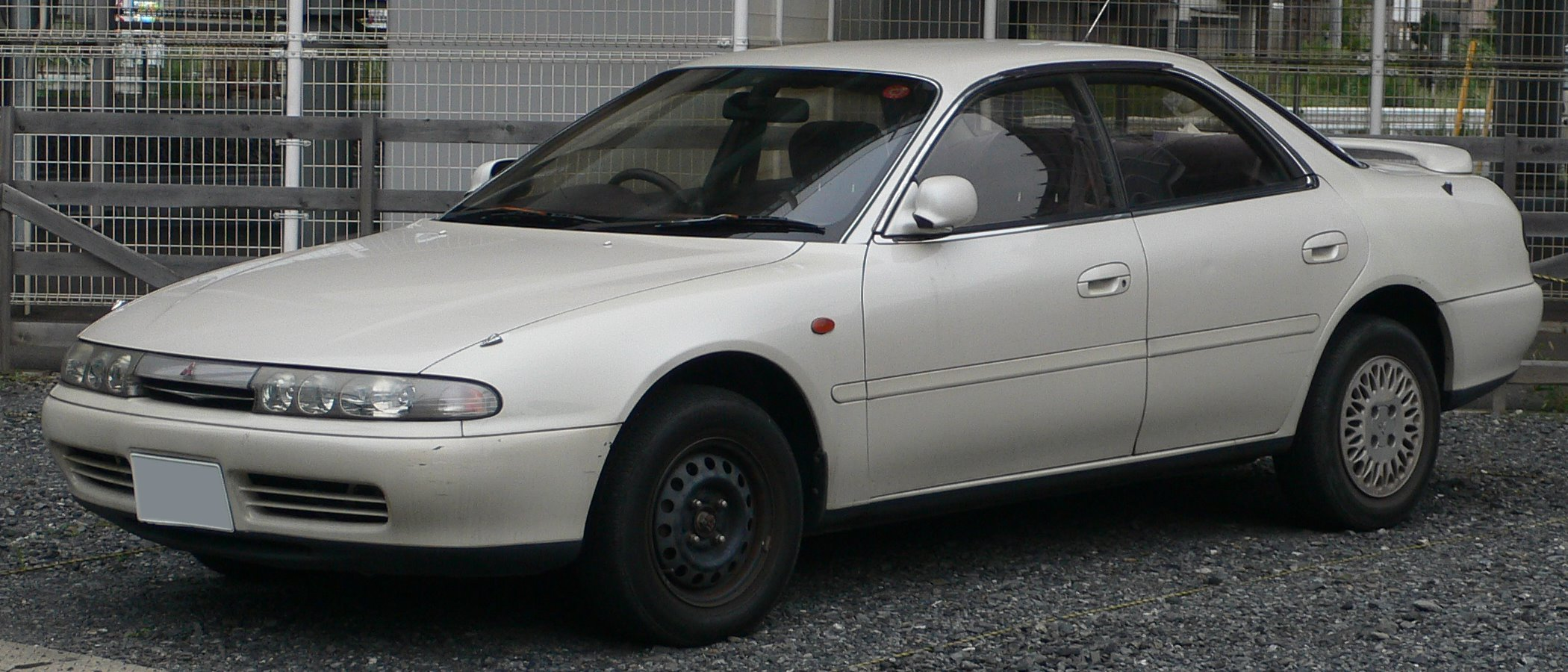
Emeraude 4-door hardtop (Japan)

== Eighth generation (EA/EC; 1996) ==
Eighth generation
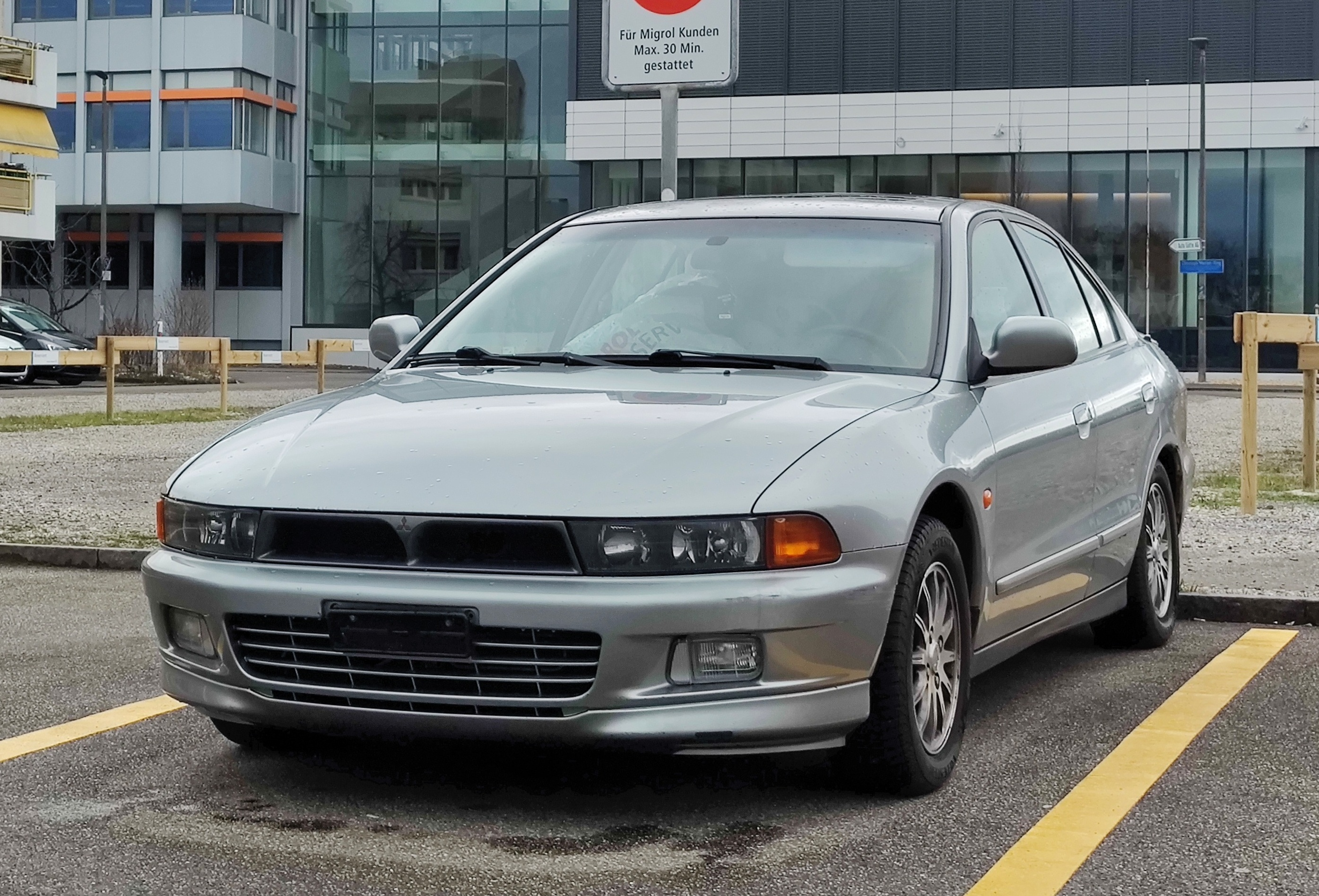
- Pre-facelift Mitsubishi Galant 2.5-V6 (Europe)

Overview
- Also called: Mitsubishi Legnum (station wagon, Japan); Mitsubishi Aspire (sedan, Japan); Mitsubishi MX/MF (Venezuela)
- Production: 1996–2006
- Assembly: Japan: Nagoya Plant, Okazaki, Aichi; United States: Normal, Illinois (MMNA); Indonesia: Pademangan, Jakarta (KKM); Philippines: Cainta (MMPC); Taiwan: Yang Mei (CMC); New Zealand: Porirua, Wellington (until 1998); Venezuela: Barcelona (MMC Automotriz)
- Designer: Akinori Nakanishi

Body and chassis
- Class: Mid-size car
- Body style: 4-door sedan (ExxA); 5-door station wagon (ExxW)
- Layout: Front-engine, front-wheel-drive (EAxx)/four-wheel-drive (ECxx)
- Related: Mitsubishi Galant VR-4

Powertrain
- Engine: Petrol: 1.8 L 4G93 I4 (EA1A/EC1A); 2.0 L 4G63 I4 (EA2A); 2.0 L 4G94 I4 (EA7A/EC7A); 2.0 L 6A12 V6 MIVEC (EA4A); 2.4 L 4G64 I4 (EA3A/EC3A); 2.5 L 6A13 V6 (EA5A); 2.5 L 6A13TT twin turbo V6 (EC5A); 3.0 L 6G72 V6 (EA8A); Diesel: 2.0 L 4D68 turbodiesel I4 (EA6A)
- Transmission: 4-speed automatic: *F4A42 (1.8/2.0/2.4/2.5 L); *F4A51 (3.0 L); *W4A42 (AWD, 1.8/2.0 L); 5-speed manual: *F5M42 (1.8/2.0/2.4/2.5 L); *W5M42 (AWD, 1.8 L); 5-speed automatic (Japan): *F5A42 (2.4 L); *W5A42 (AWD, 2.4 L)

Dimensions
- Wheelbase: 2,635 mm (103.7 in)
- Length: 4,620–4,660 mm (181.9–183.5 in) (sedan); 4,670–4,740 mm (183.9–186.6 in) (station wagon); 4,770 mm (187.8 in) (North America)
- Width: 1,740 mm (68.5 in)
- Height: 1,415–1,430 mm (55.7–56.3 in) (sedan); 1,460–1,510 mm (57.5–59.4 in) (station wagon)
- Curb weight: 1,240–1,470 kg (2,733.7–3,240.8 lb) (sedan); 1,310–1,520 kg (2,888.1–3,351.0 lb) (station wagon)

The eighth-generation 1996 model continued the 1992's design themes but a five-door station wagon (known in Japan as the Legnum, derives from the Latin word regnum, meaning regal power or rank) was added while the five-door liftback was dropped. This model won the 1996–97 Car of the Year Japan award for the second time. Despite being superseded in the US and Europe from 2003, it remained on sale in other countries until 2006. In Japan, the Legnum was sold only at a specific retail chain called "Car Plaza", while the Galant remained exclusive to Galant Shop locations. The Japanese market model was the first mass-produced car to use a gasoline direct injection engine, when a GDI version of the 4G93 inline-four 1.8 L engine was introduced. The turbodiesel engine option was deleted in Japan, but retained for Europe and select general export markets. The all-wheel drive option was also eliminated for export markets.

This model was also produced in Barcelona, Venezuela, at the only Mitsubishi plant in Latin America. At the beginning, the Galant was marketed in that country under the "MX" and "MF" names in 1997 and 1998 (featuring a manual or INVECS-II automatic transmission respectively), then kept the Galant name until the end of its production in 2006.

The American market Galant, introduced on 7 July 1998, graduated to the US Environmental Protection Agency's mid-size class. The front suspension design switched from multi-link to struts, though the rear was upgraded with a stabilizer bar standard on all but the base DE model. The DE, ES and LS models were offered with a 145 hp (108 kW; 147 PS) Inline-four 2.4 L 4G64 SOHC engine from the previous generation as standard. A 195 hp (145 kW; 198 PS) 3.0 L 6G72 SOHC 24-valve was standard for the top "GTZ" model, but also available as option for ES and LS. Both engines were mated to a standard four-speed conventional automatic transmission. Another difference between Asian and European models was the lack of ABS, which was only installed on 3.0 L models. It received a facelift for the 2002 model year, the 2.4 L engine was derated to 140 hp (100 kW; 140 PS).

In August 1998, Mitsubishi introduced the Aspire as the successor of Eterna. Externally identical to the facelifted Galant at the same time of introduction. The Aspire was only powered by 1.8 and 2.0 L engines.

Mitsubishi opted to further develop the technology in its range-topping VR-4, which was now powered by an enlarged 2.5 L V6 twin-turbo. The car features either a conventional five-speed manual or INVECS-II transmission. Some variants (all of the pre-facelift model and Type-S for the facelift model) were also fitted with the same advanced active yaw control (AYC) as the Lancer Evolution, to give it greater agility than would be expected of such a large vehicle. Finally, as with the rest of the range, the VR-4 could now be had either as a Galant sedan or as a Legnum station wagon. The VR-4 appearance package was also offered as "Viento" in Japan or "Avance" in select export markets.

The 200 PS (150 kW; 200 hp) MIVEC version of the 2.0 L 6A12 V6 model was eliminated from the Japanese market model, but offered in select Asian market (such as Hong Kong or Singapore) with a trim level called "VR-M" and equipped with Viento/Avance aero package. The larger 2.5 L 6A13 V6 was more common in the rest of the world. It produced 163–167 PS (120–123 kW; 161–165 hp) for export markets, but rated higher at 175 PS (129 kW; 173 hp) for the Japanese market Legnum station wagon.

Safety

National Highway Traffic Safety Administration crash test ratings for 2001 Galant without side airbags:

- Frontal driver:
- Frontal passenger:
- Side driver:
- Side rear passenger:
- Rollover: not rated

National Highway Traffic Safety Administration crash test ratings for 1999–2002 Galant with side airbags:

- Frontal driver:
- Frontal passenger:
- Side driver:
- Side rear passenger:
- Rollover:
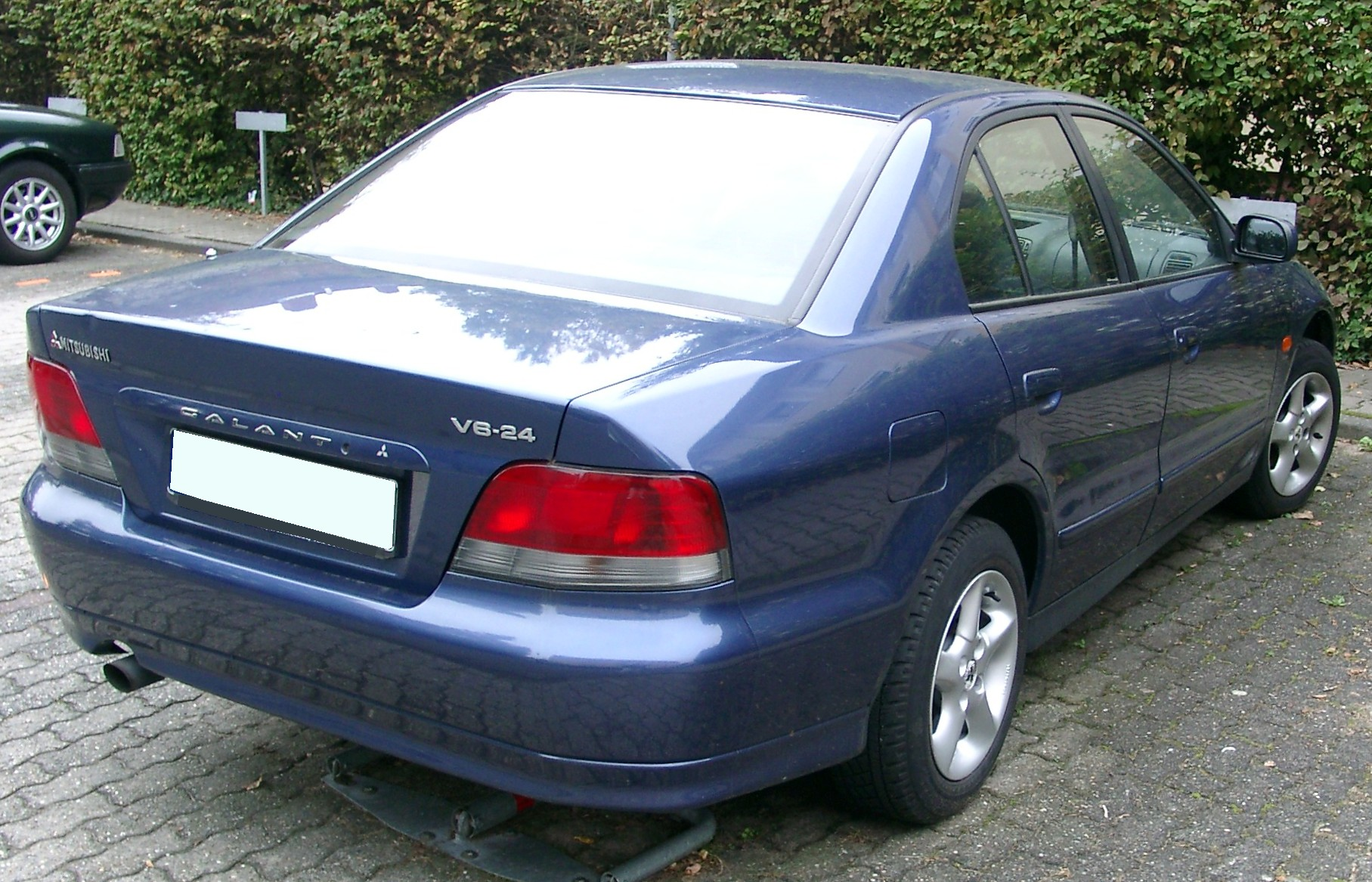
Pre-facelift Mitsubishi Galant V6-24 (Europe)

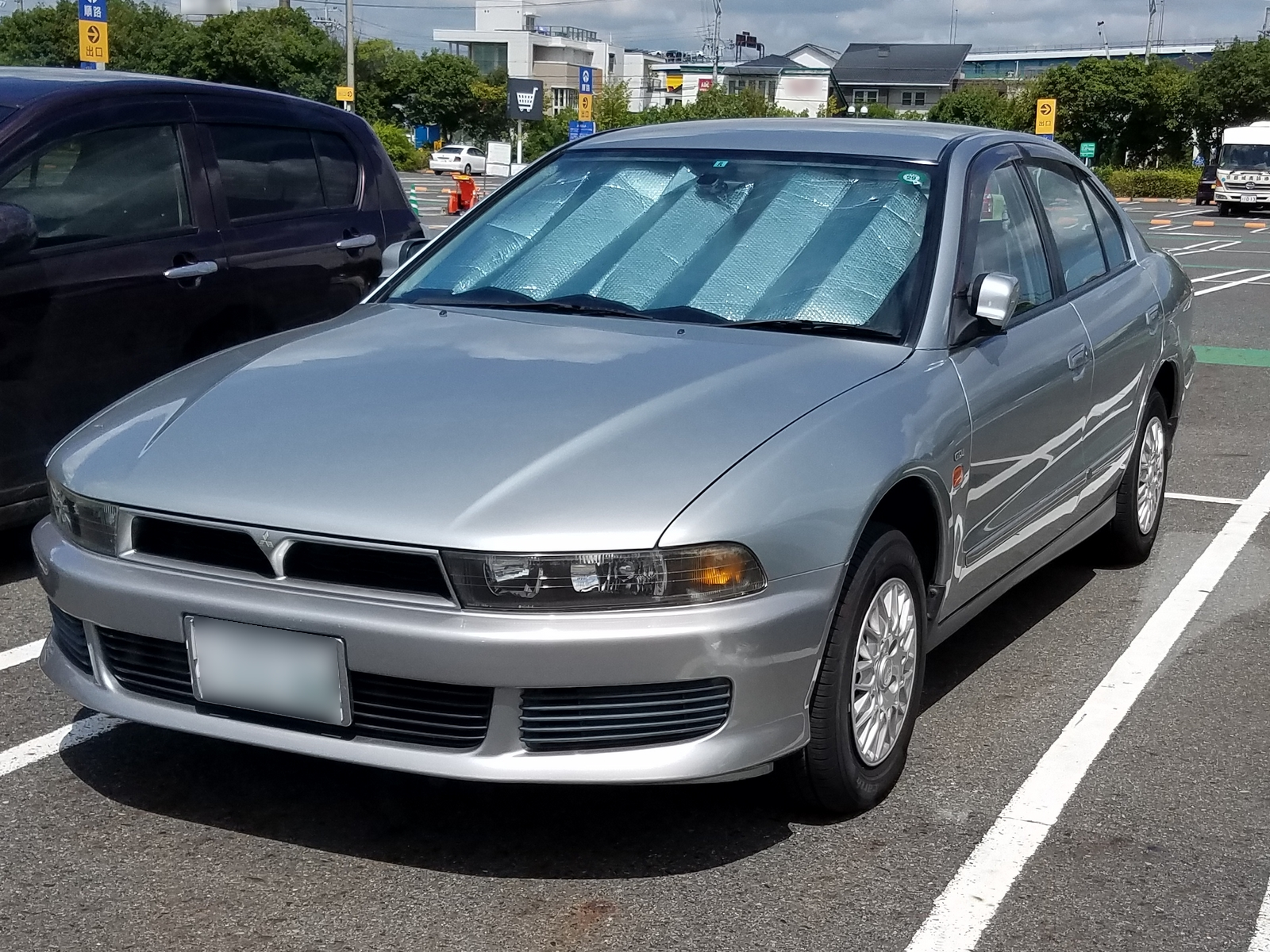
Facelift Mitsubishi Galant VR-G (Japan)

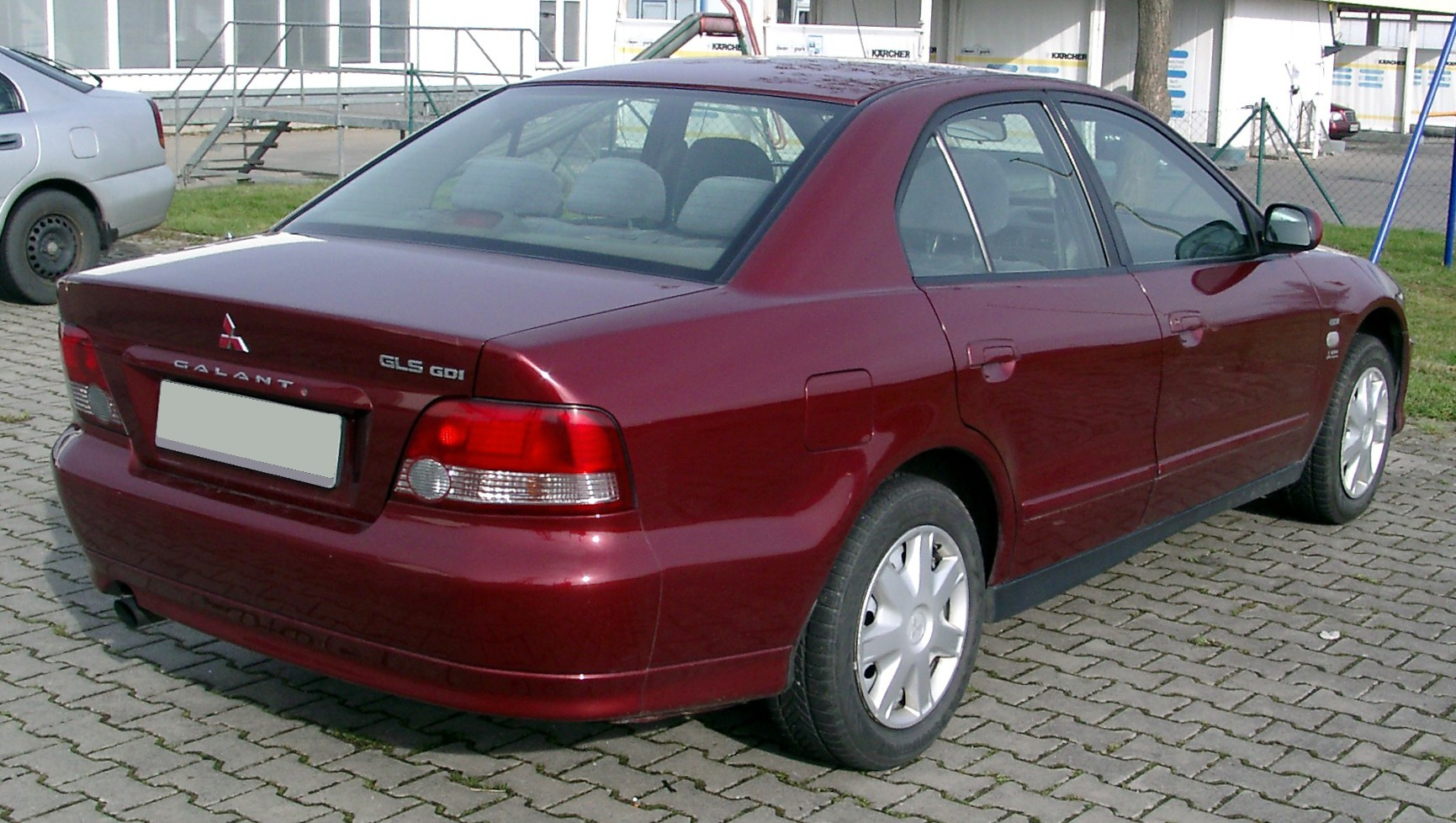
Facelift Mitsubishi Galant GLS (Europe)

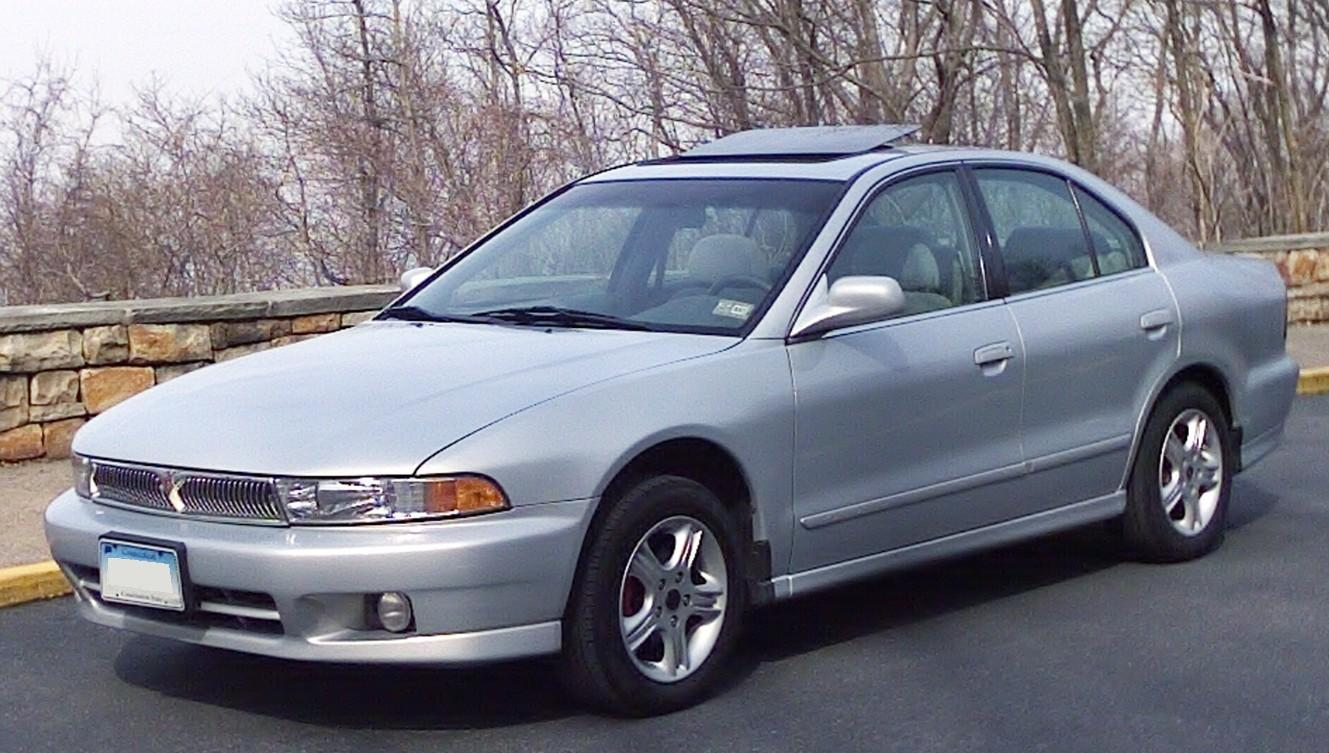
1998–2001 Mitsubishi Galant ES (US)

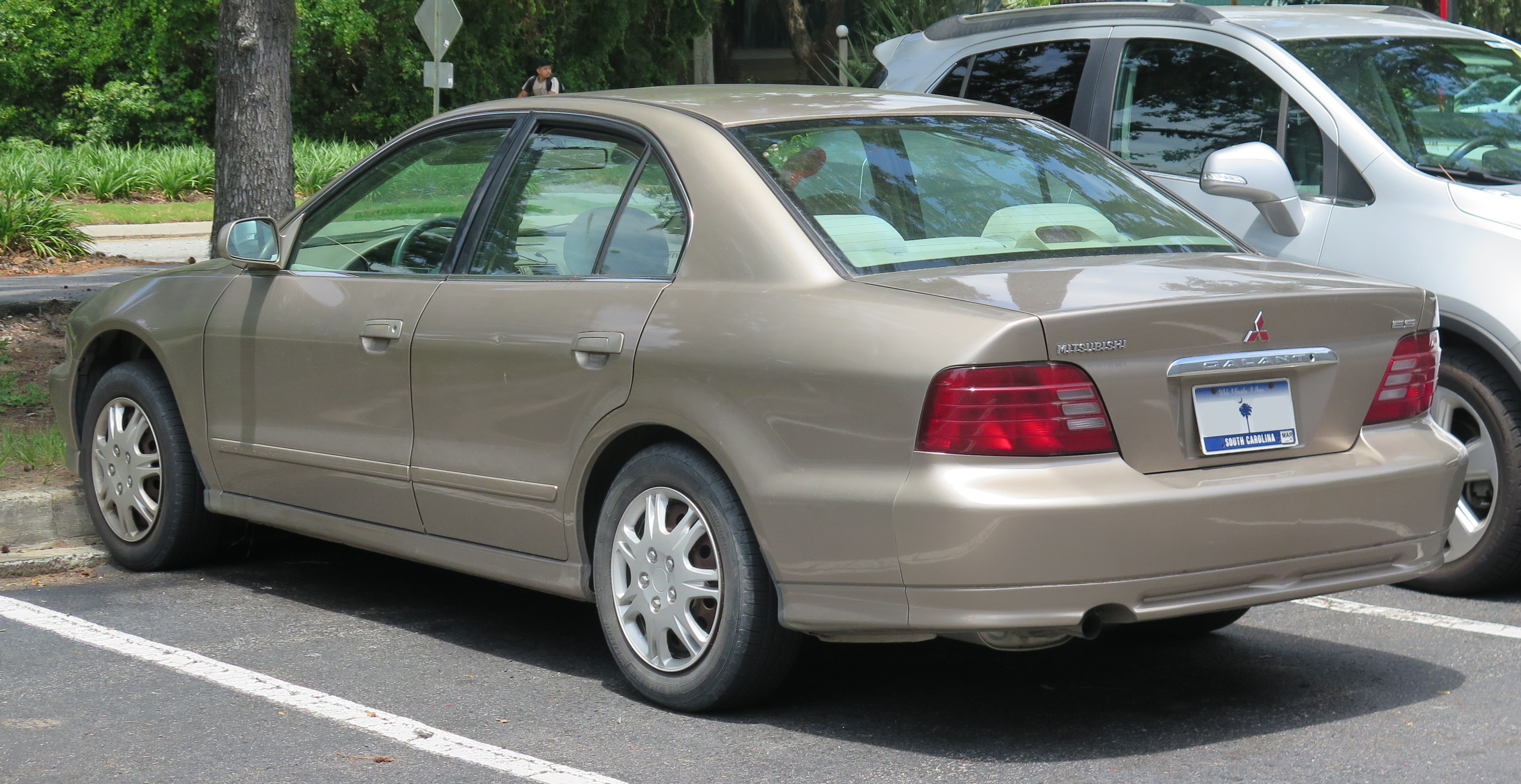
1998–2001 Mitsubishi Galant ES (US)

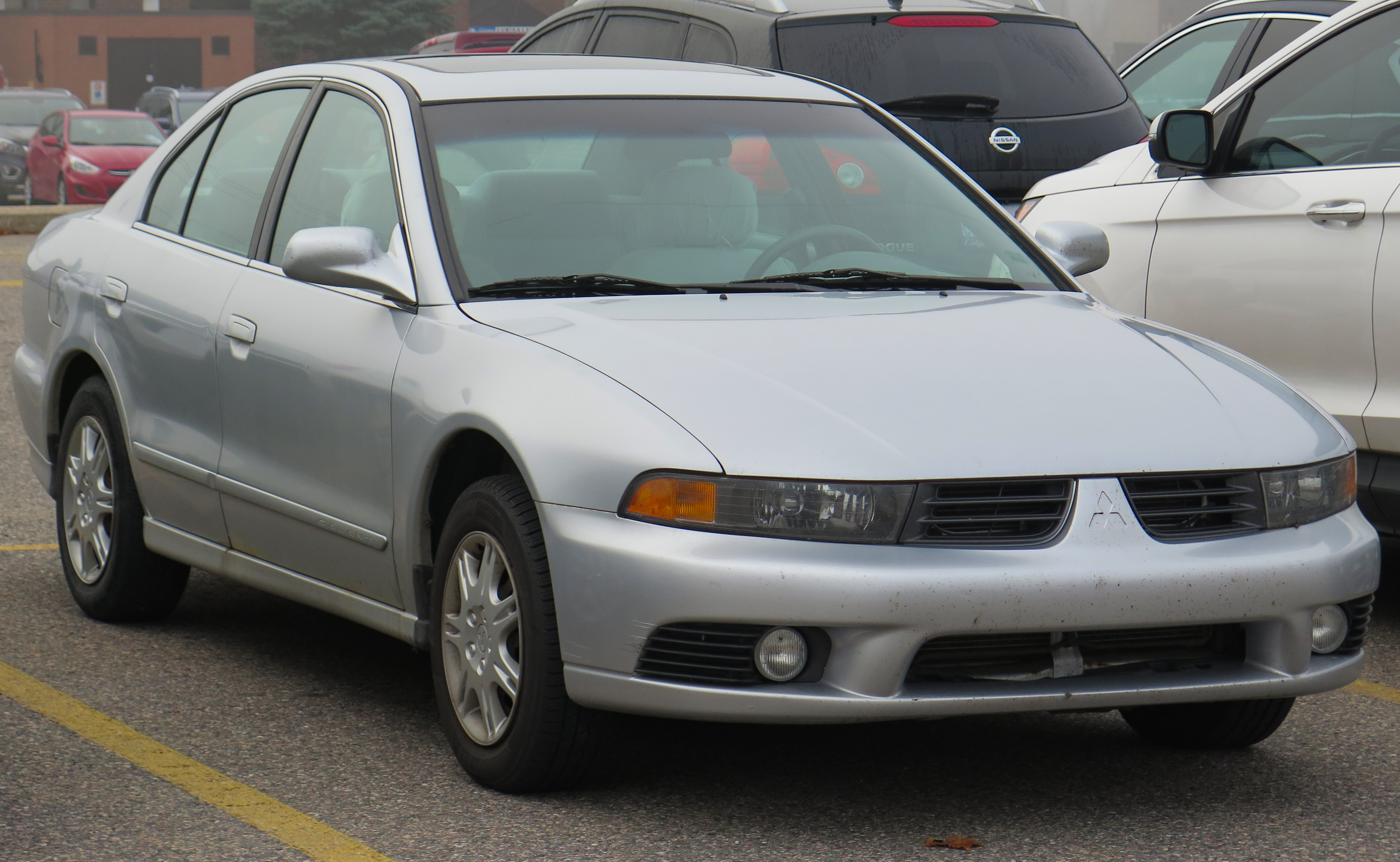
2003 Mitsubishi Galant ES (Canada)

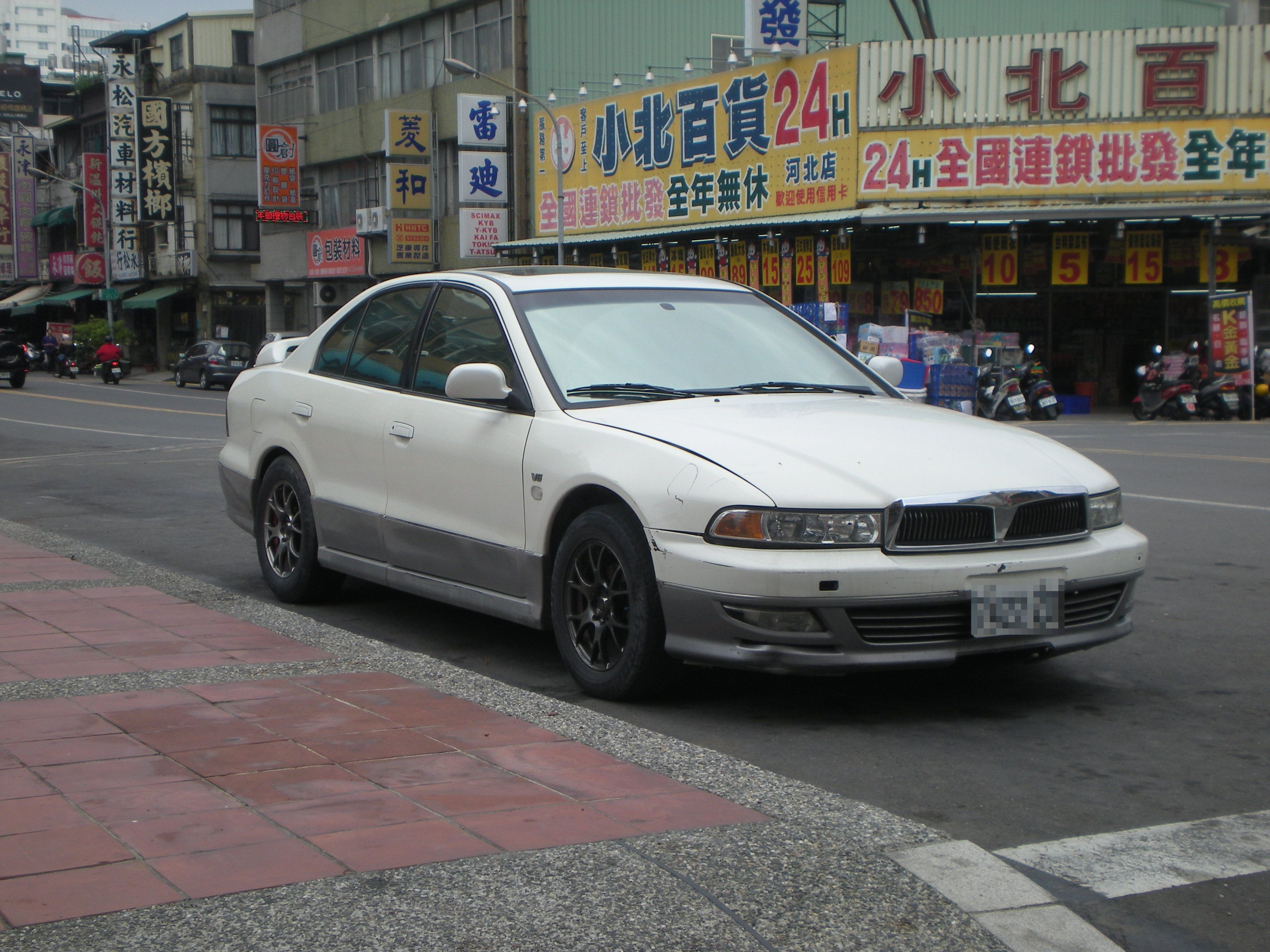
Facelift Mitsubishi Galant (Taiwan)

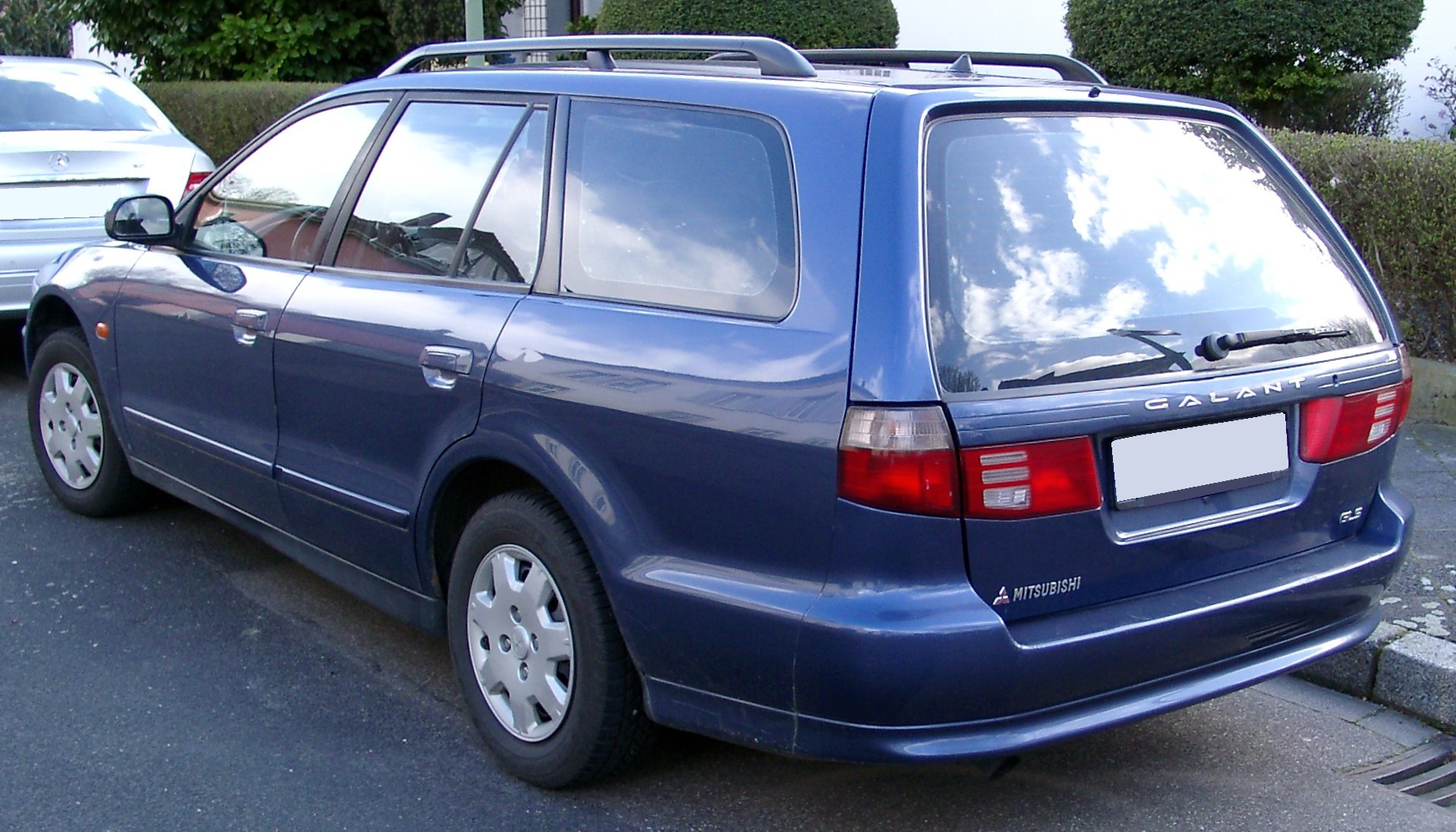
Pre-facelift Mitsubishi Galant GLS station wagon (Europe)

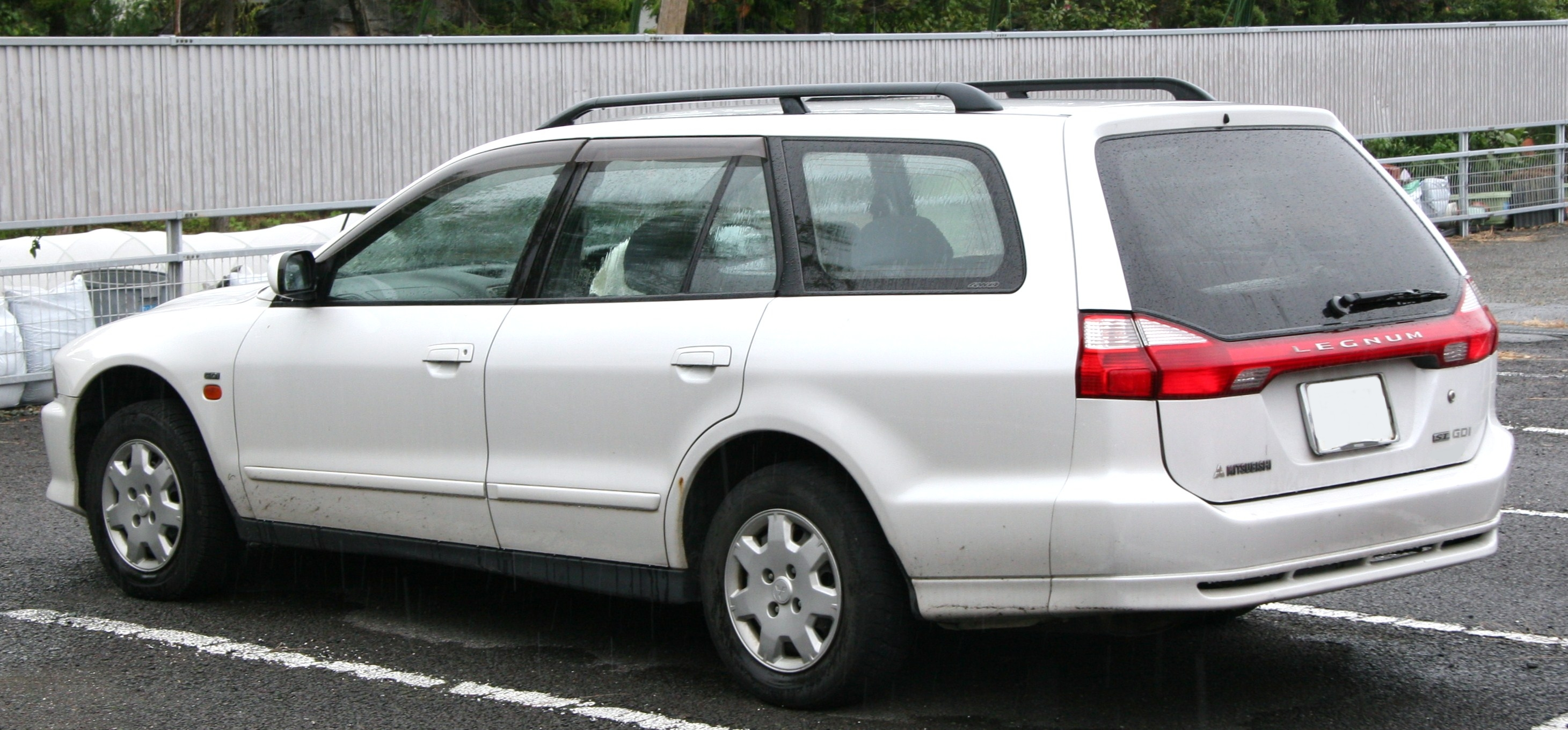
Facelift Mitsubishi Legnum ST (Japan)

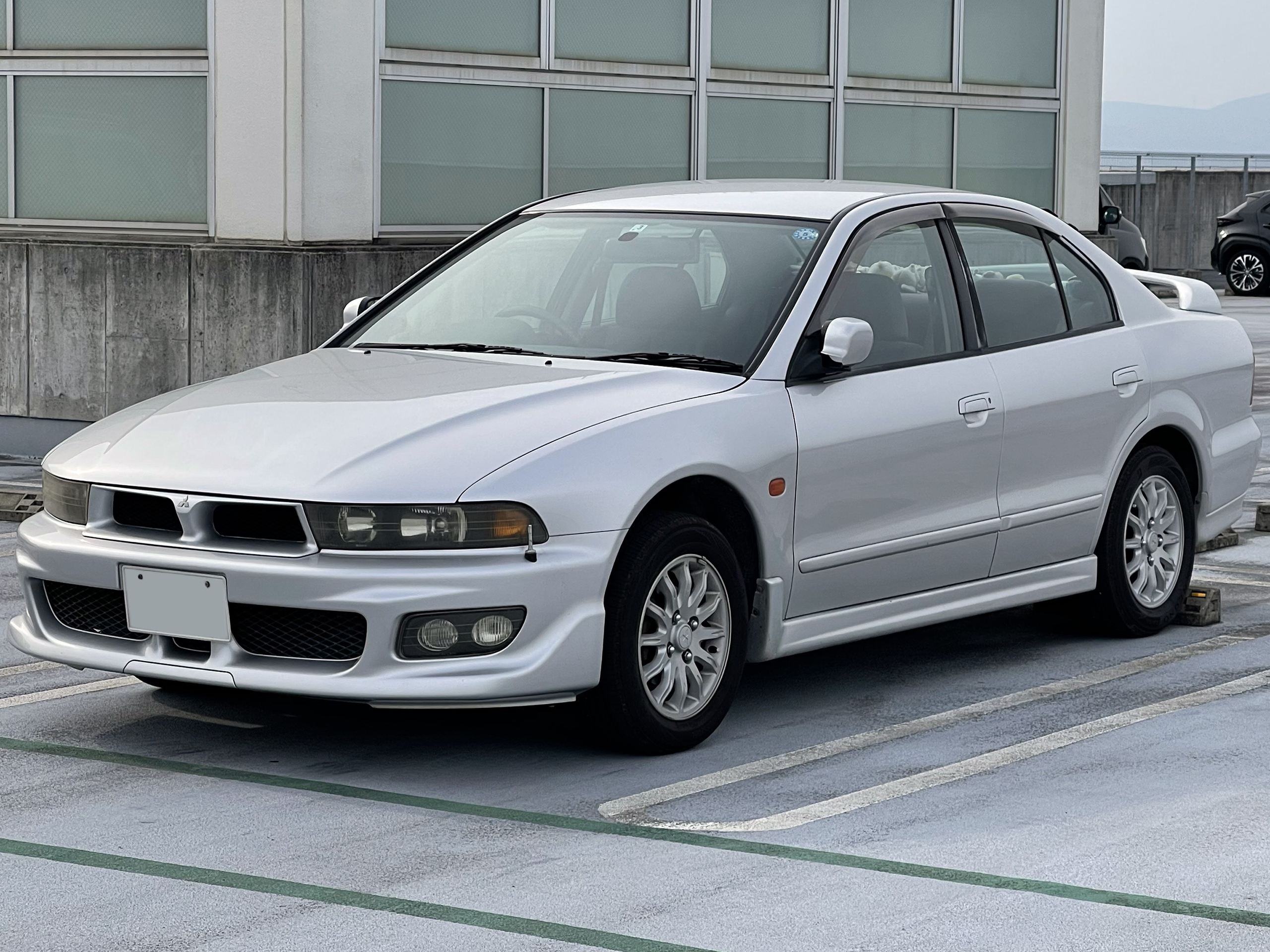
Mitsubishi Galant Viento/Avance, equipped with an aero package from the VR-4 (VR-4 has 5 lug nuts)

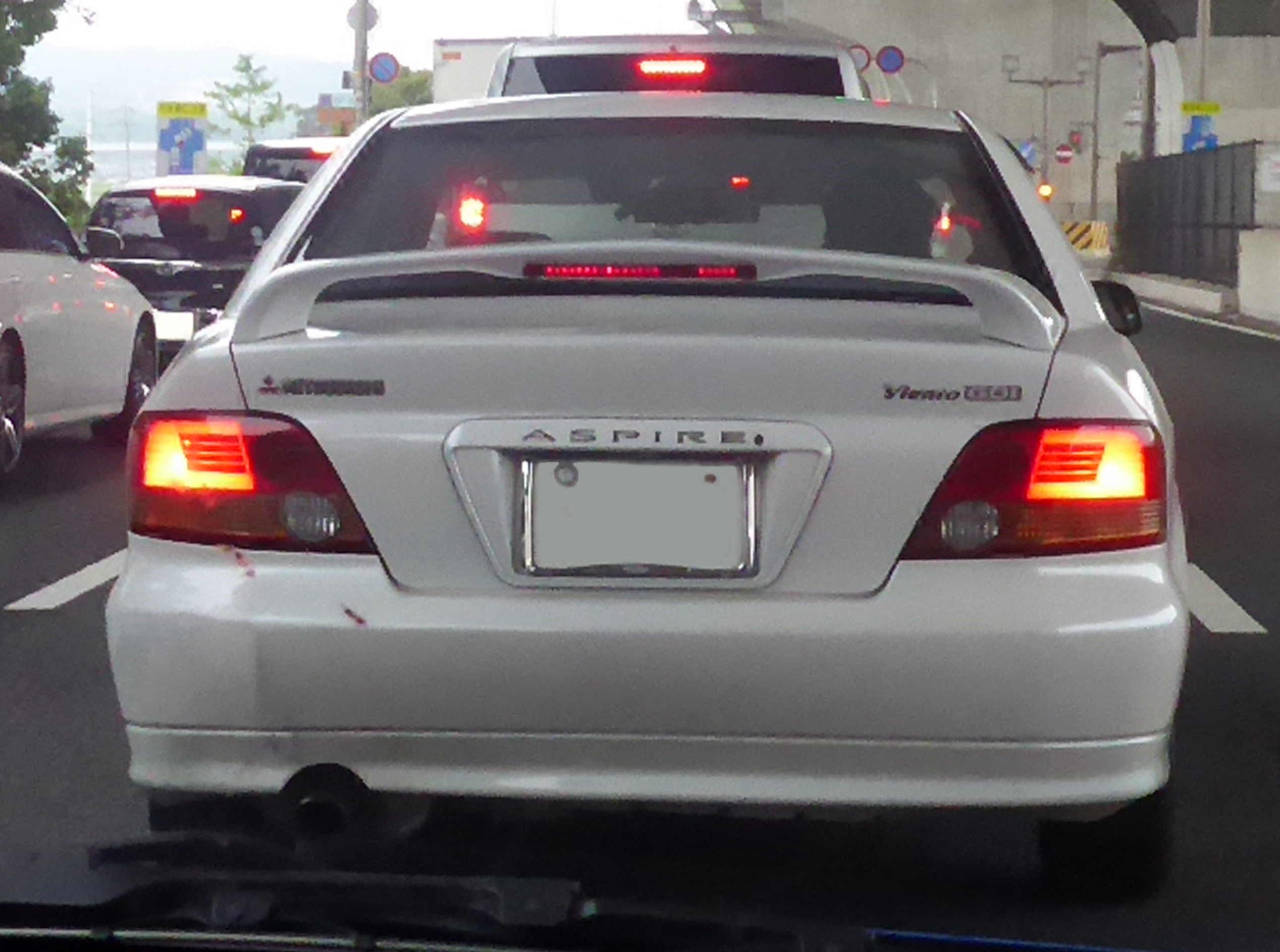
Mitsubishi Aspire Viento (Japan)

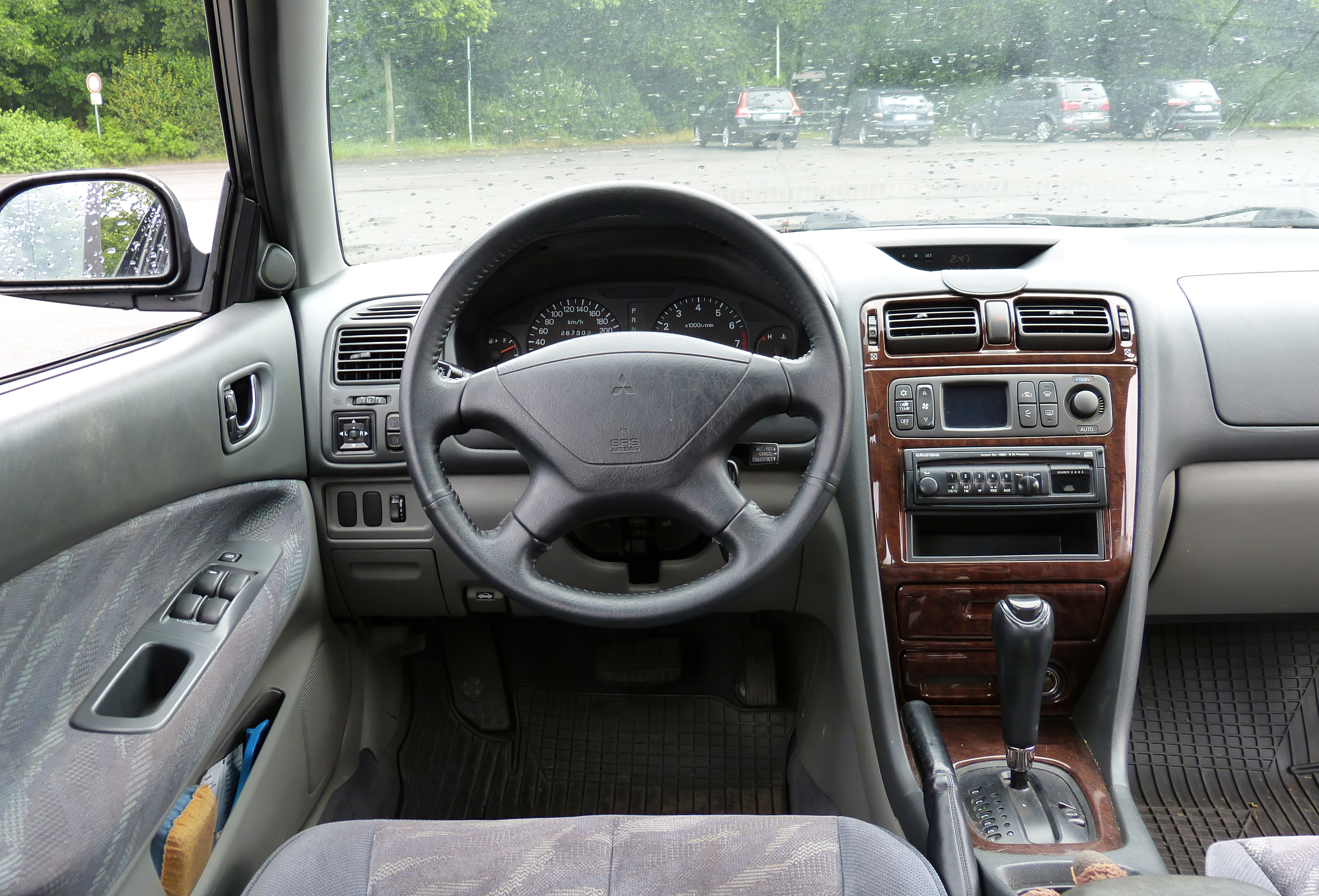
Pre-facelift interior

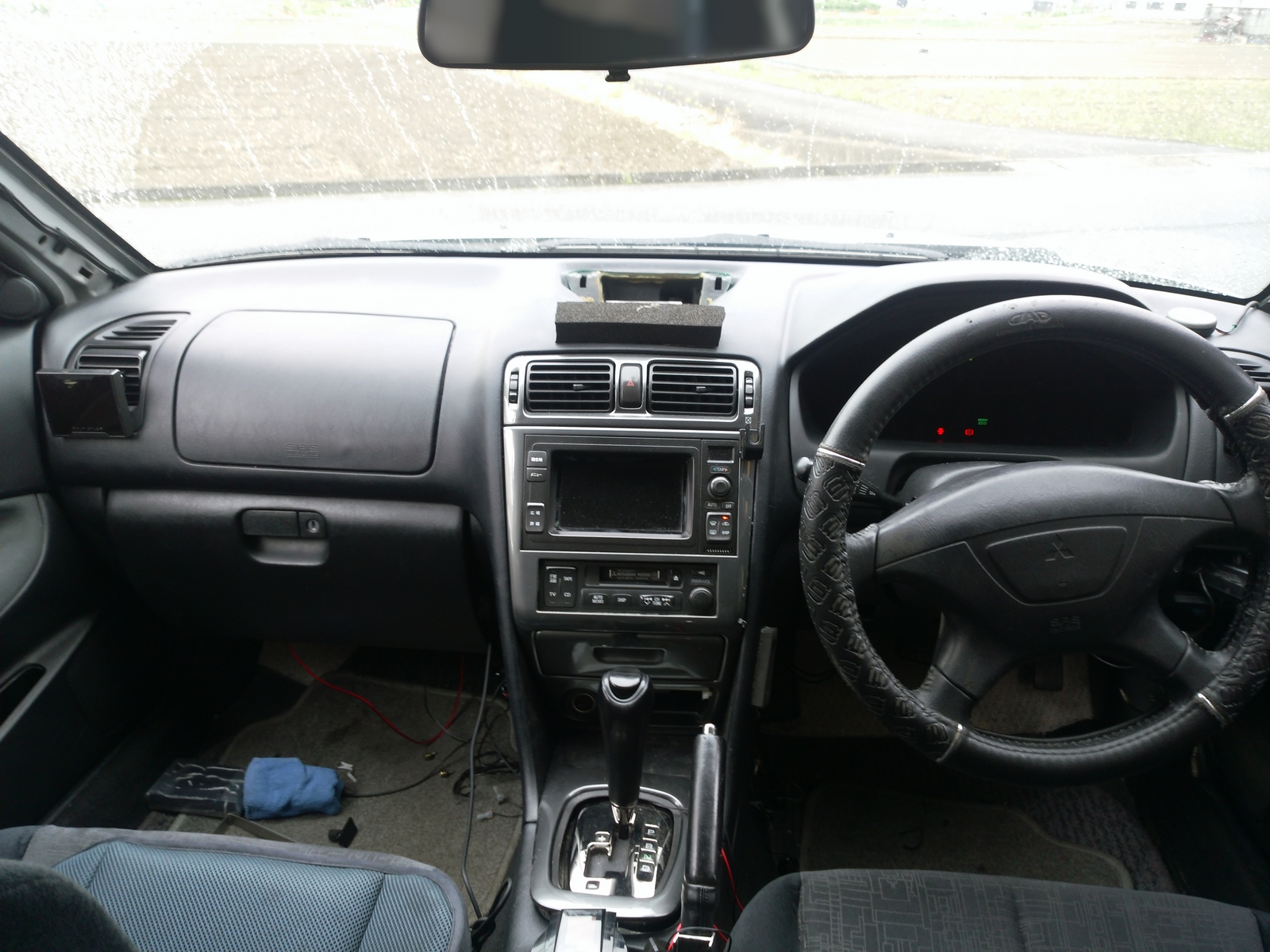
Facelift interior

== Ninth generation (DJ/DM; 2004) ==
Ninth generation
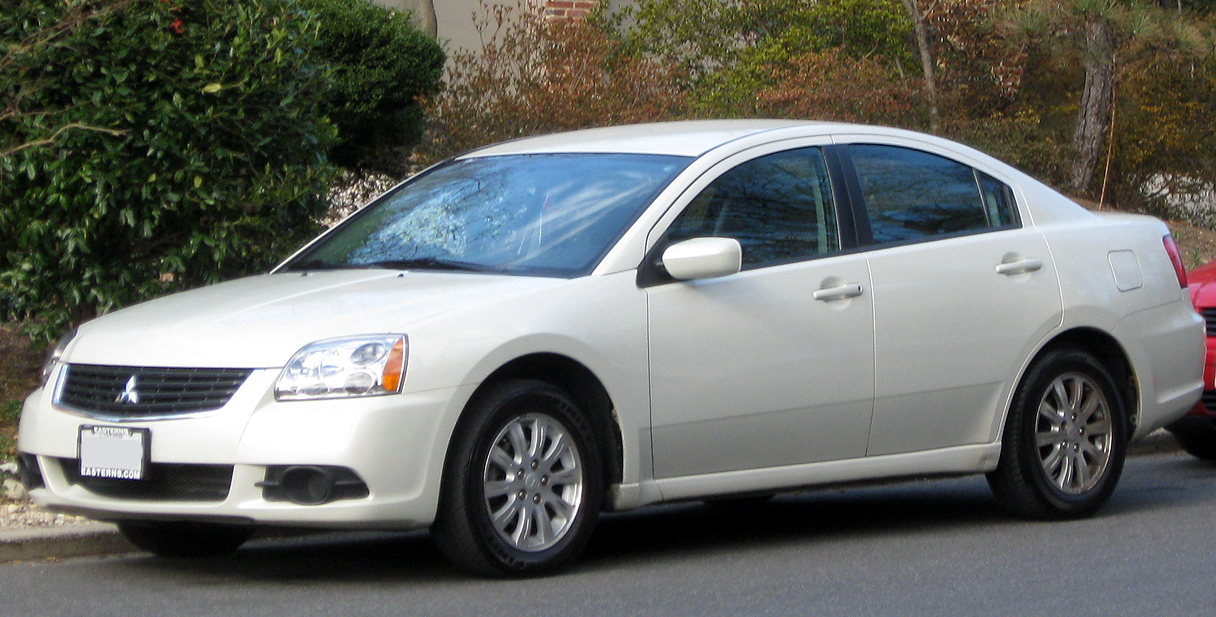
- 2009–2012 Mitsubishi Galant

Overview
- Also called: Mitsubishi Grunder (Taiwan); Mitsubishi 380 (Australia and New Zealand)
- Production: 2003–2012
- Model years: 2004–2012
- Assembly: United States: Normal, Illinois (MMNA); Australia: Clovelly Park, South Australia (MMAL; 380); China: Fuzhou (Soueast Motors); Taiwan: Taoyuan (CMC)
- Designer: Olivier Boulay

Body and chassis
- Class: Mid-size car
- Body style: 4-door sedan
- Layout: Front-engine, front-wheel-drive
- Platform: Mitsubishi PS platform
- Related: Mitsubishi Eclipse; Mitsubishi Endeavor

Powertrain
- Engine: 2.4 L 4G69 I4 (DJ1A/DM1A); 3.8 L 6G75 V6 (DJ3A); 3.8 L 6G75 V6 MIVEC (DJ5A)
- Transmission: 4-speed automatic 5-speed automatic

Dimensions
- Wheelbase: 108.3 in (2,750 mm)
- Length: 4,840–4,850 mm (190.4–191 in)
- Width: 1,840 mm (72.4 in)
- Height: 1,470–1,480 mm (57.9–58.2 in)
- Curb weight: 1540 kg (3395 lbs) (ES/LS); 1696 kg (3739 lbs) (Ralliart)

=== North America ===
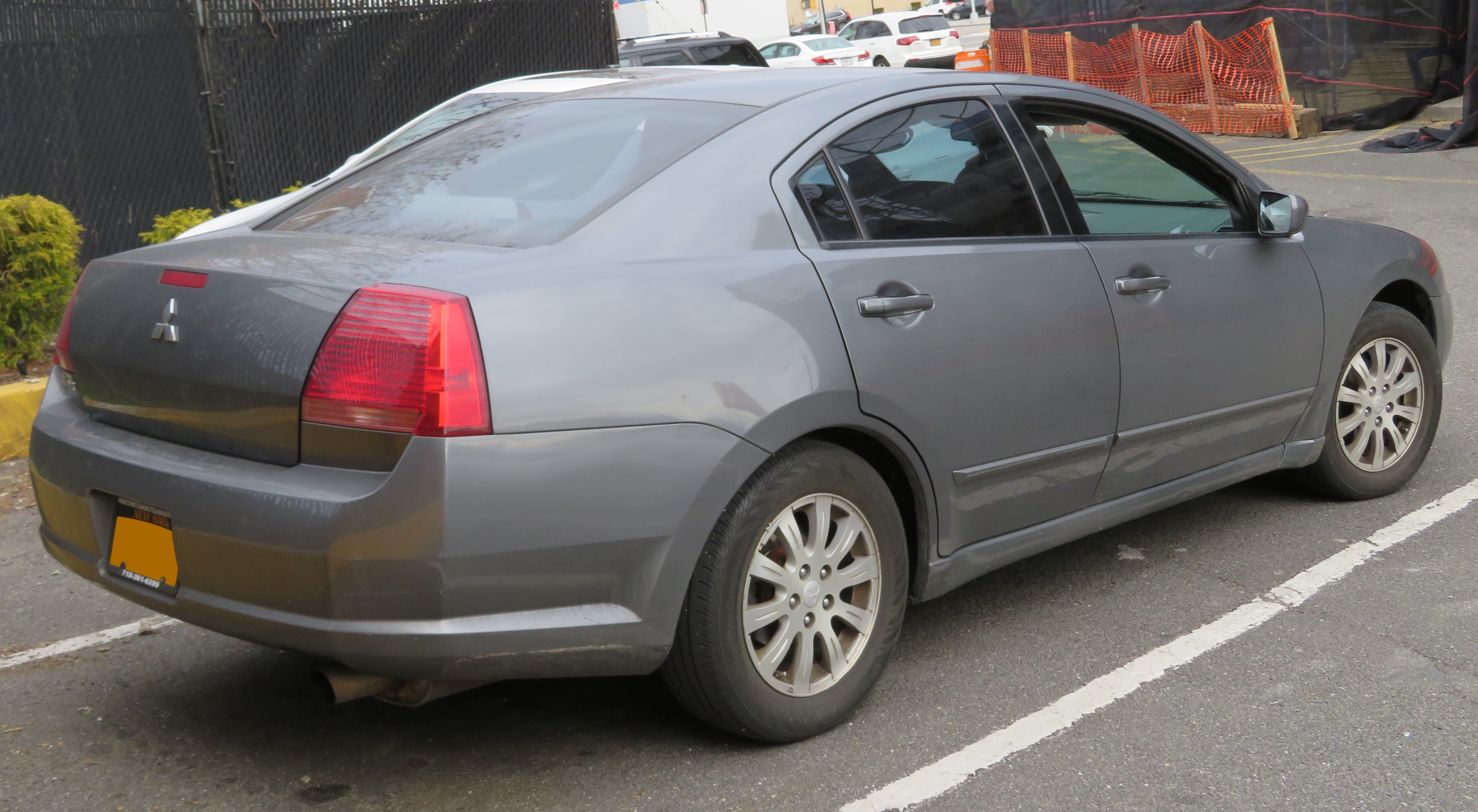
Rear view

The sedan-only ninth-generation PS platform model launched in the United States on October 15, 2003. It was announced at the 2003 New York International Auto Show in April for the 2004 model year, following the exhibition of the SSS concept sedan at the North American International Auto Show three years before. The ninth-generation United States-sourced model is available for sale only in a few regional markets, namely the United States, Puerto Rico, Russia, Ukraine and Arabia. Russia began sourcing its Galants from the United States from 2006. The Arabian markets began sourcing their Galants from the United States from the 2007 model year. The Galant had also been available in Canada and Mexico until the 2010 and 2009 model years, respectively.

A size increase resulted in slightly more interior space and a weight gain of several hundred pounds. The four-cylinder engine, while still 2.4 liters in displacement, upgraded from Mitsubishi's 4G64 design to the newer 4G69 design, resulting in a horsepower increase from 140 hp (100 kW) to 160 hp (120 kW) and 157 lb⋅ft (213 N⋅m). Likewise, the V6 jumped from a 3.0-liter with 190 hp (140 kW) to a 3.8-liter with 235 hp (175 kW) and 250 lb⋅ft (339 N⋅m). All North American Galants gained all-wheel disc brakes but lost their rear stabilizer bar.

A Ralliart version joined for 2007, finally upgrading the V6 to a class-competitive 258 hp (192 kW) and 258 lb⋅ft (350 N⋅m) while also adding a firmer suspension, front strut tower bar, rear stabilizer bar, and eighteen-inch alloy wheels. Furthermore, the Ralliart trim was the first Galant to receive Mitsubishi's updated infotainment system (MMCS) featuring a 7-inch touchscreen display with GPS navigation. The Ralliart was further distinguished from other Galant trims by a unique front aero bumper, sport mesh grille, projector-style ellipsoid headlamps, two-tone bumpers and color-keyed side air dams. For 2008, the trimming of models left the Ralliart as the only V6 model, and the Galant skips the 2008 model year in Canada, only to return in 2009 with the facelifted model.

Four-cylinder Galant models sold in California, Maine, Massachusetts, New York and Vermont are certified as Partial Zero-Emissions Vehicles (PZEV), with the engine rated 155 hp (116 kW).

This iteration of the Mitsubishi Galant only went on sale in the Middle East region for the 2007 model year, with a 2.4-liter engine and a 3.8-liter engine, imported from the United States.

Osamu Masuko, the CEO of Mitsubishi Motors, indicated that the ninth generation of the Galant would be the last to be manufactured in North America, to be replaced on the MMNA production line in Illinois by smaller vehicles which are more likely to appeal to export markets.

The final Mitsubishi Galant rolled off the assembly line in the United States on August 30, 2012. The Mitsubishi Concept-ZT that was unveiled in 2007 was initially expected to become the tenth generation Galant but this never materialized.

==== Facelifts ====
2006 The Galant receives some cosmetic changes, such as an AC adapter, a standard MP3 jack and upgrades to the interior.

2007 In 2007, the Galant was restyled - the interior and exterior were refreshed and an updated infotainment system was introduced.

2009 In 2009, the Galant was restyled for a third time during this generation. The 2009 Galant launched in February 2008.

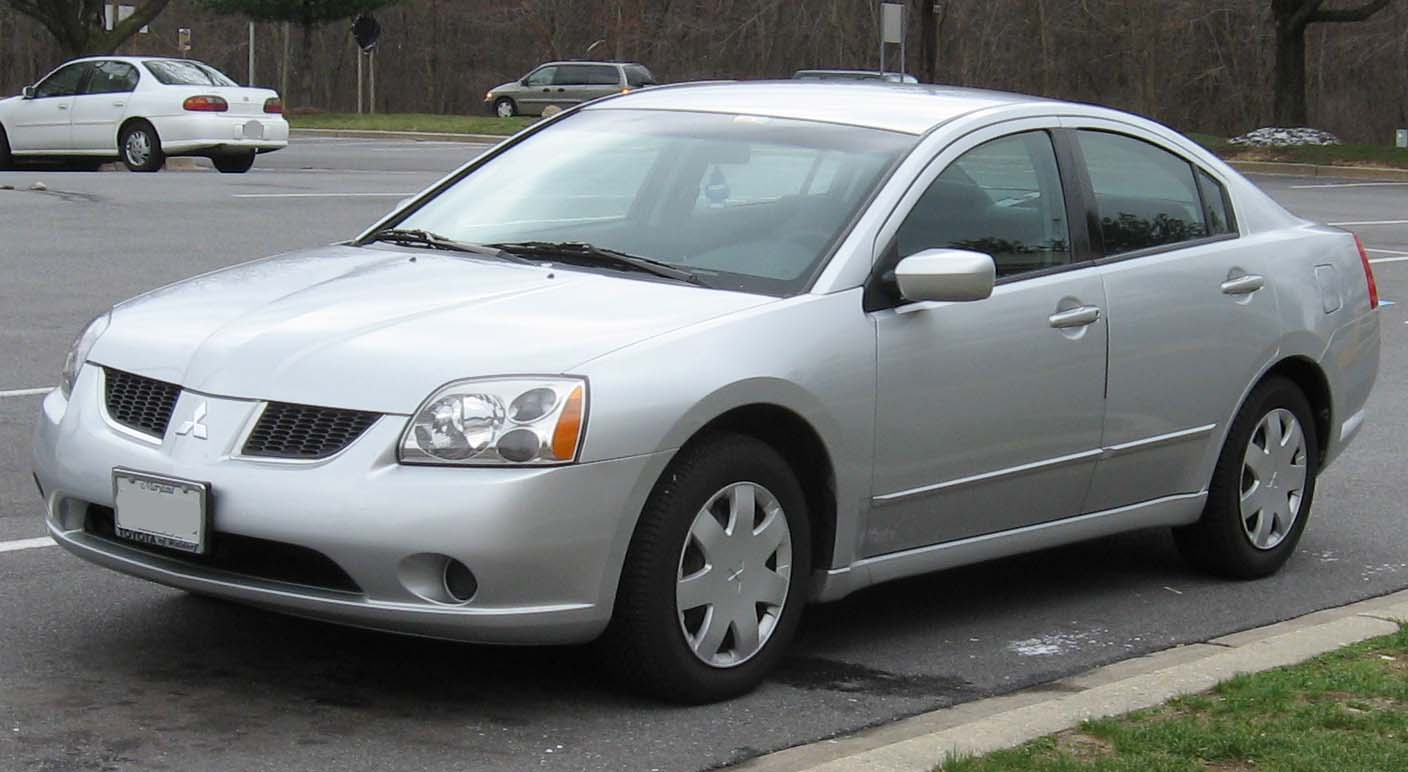
2004–2006 Mitsubishi Galant (US)

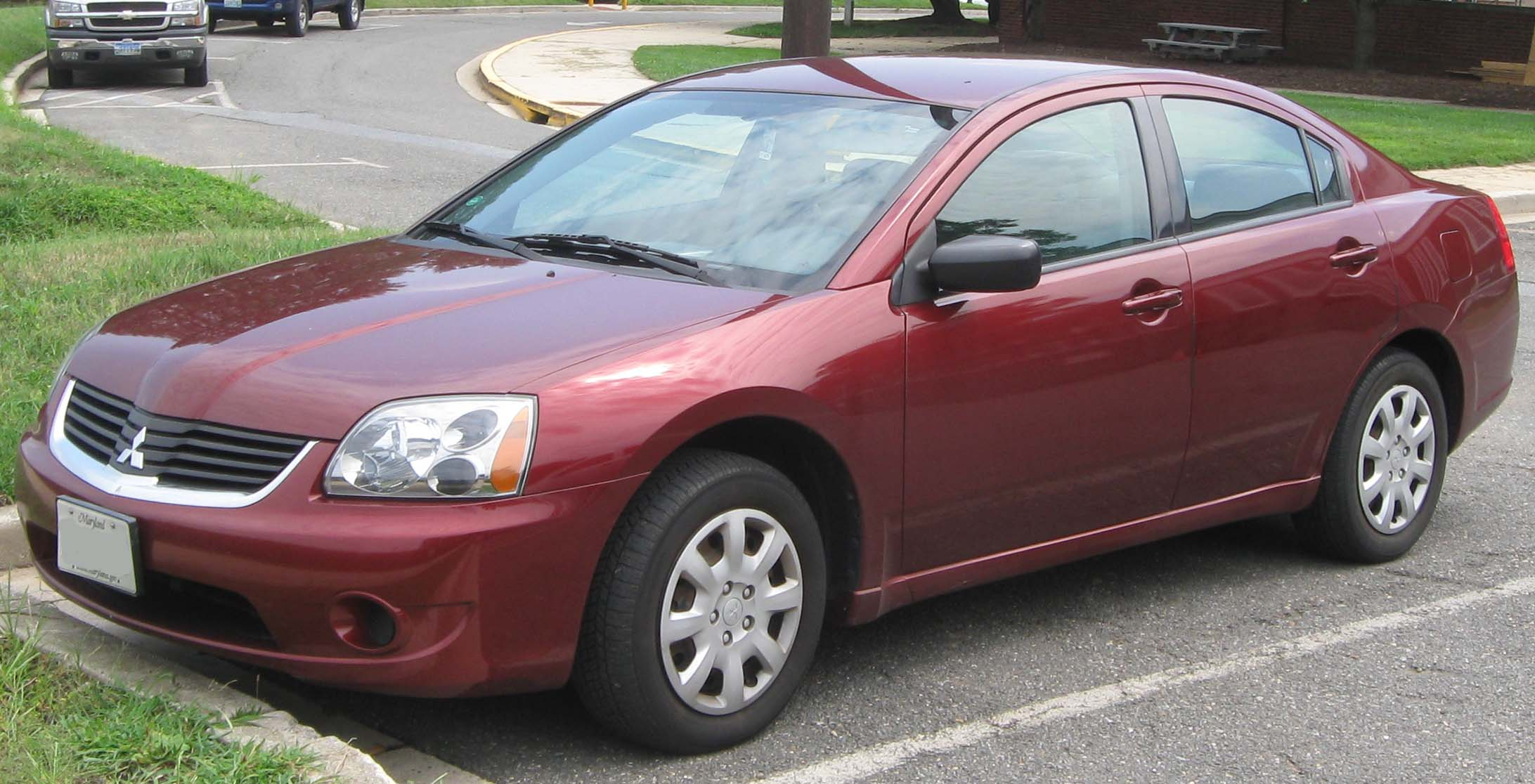
2007–2008 Mitsubishi Galant (US)

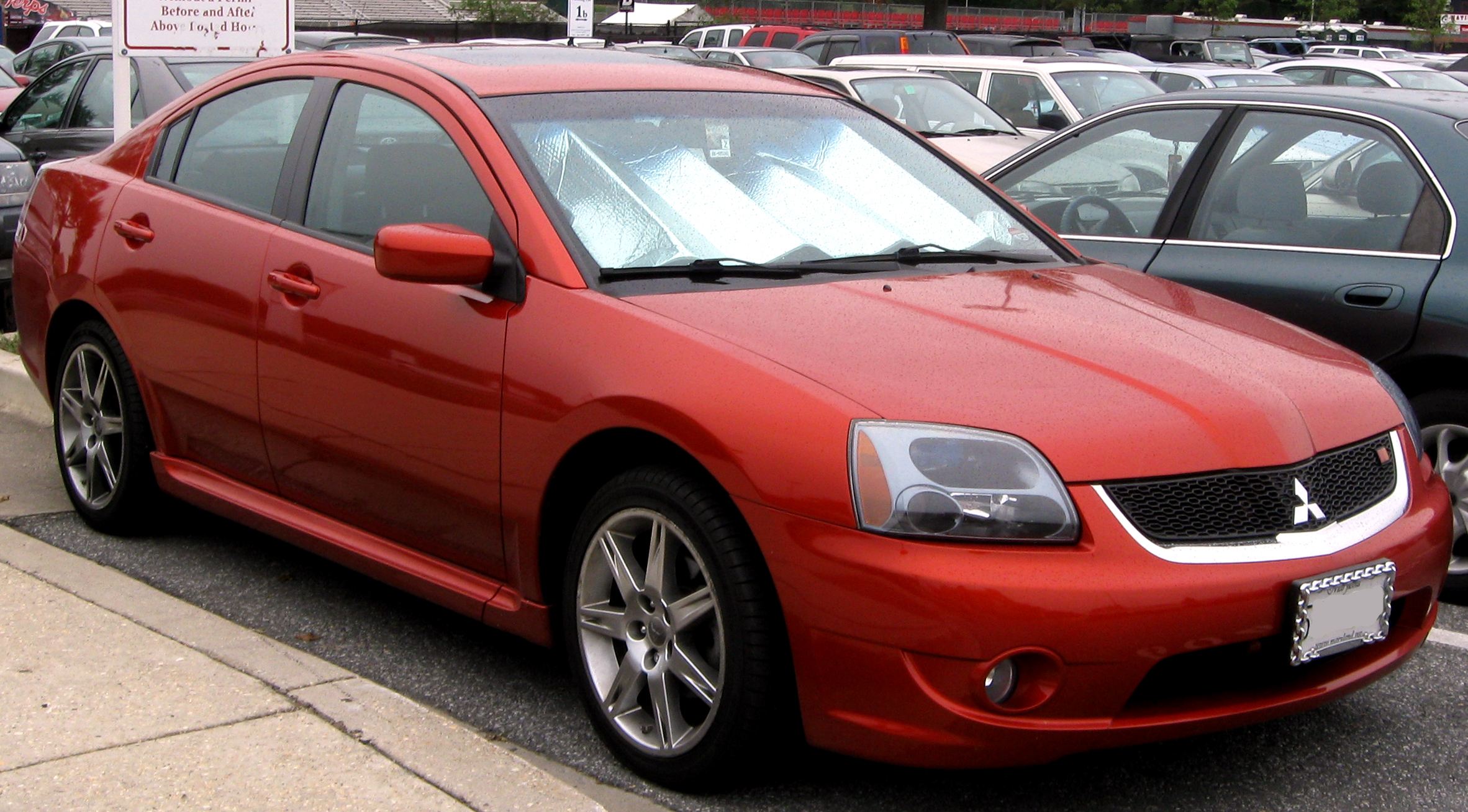
2007–2008 Mitsubishi Galant Ralliart (US)

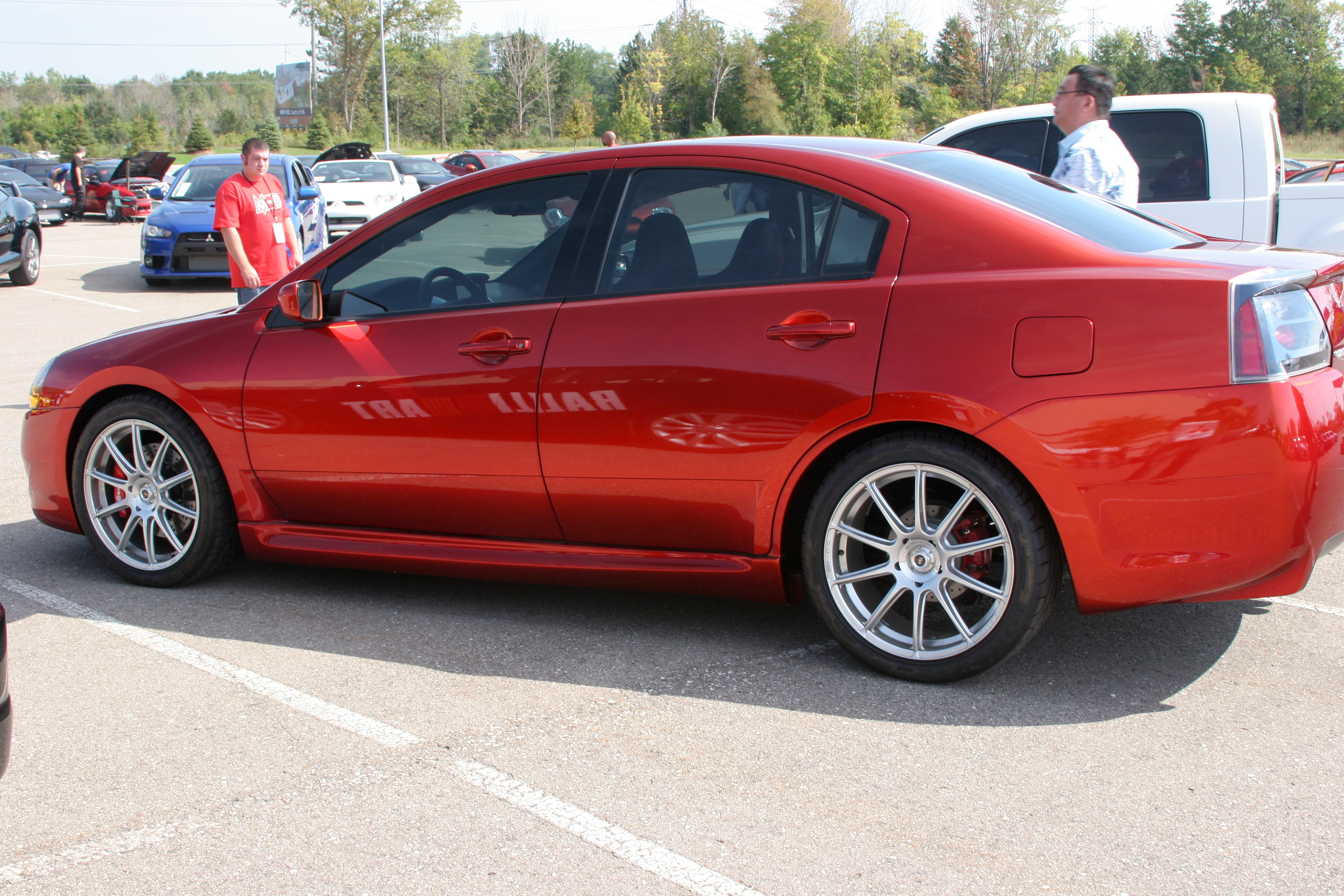
2007–2008 Mitsubishi Galant Ralliart (US)

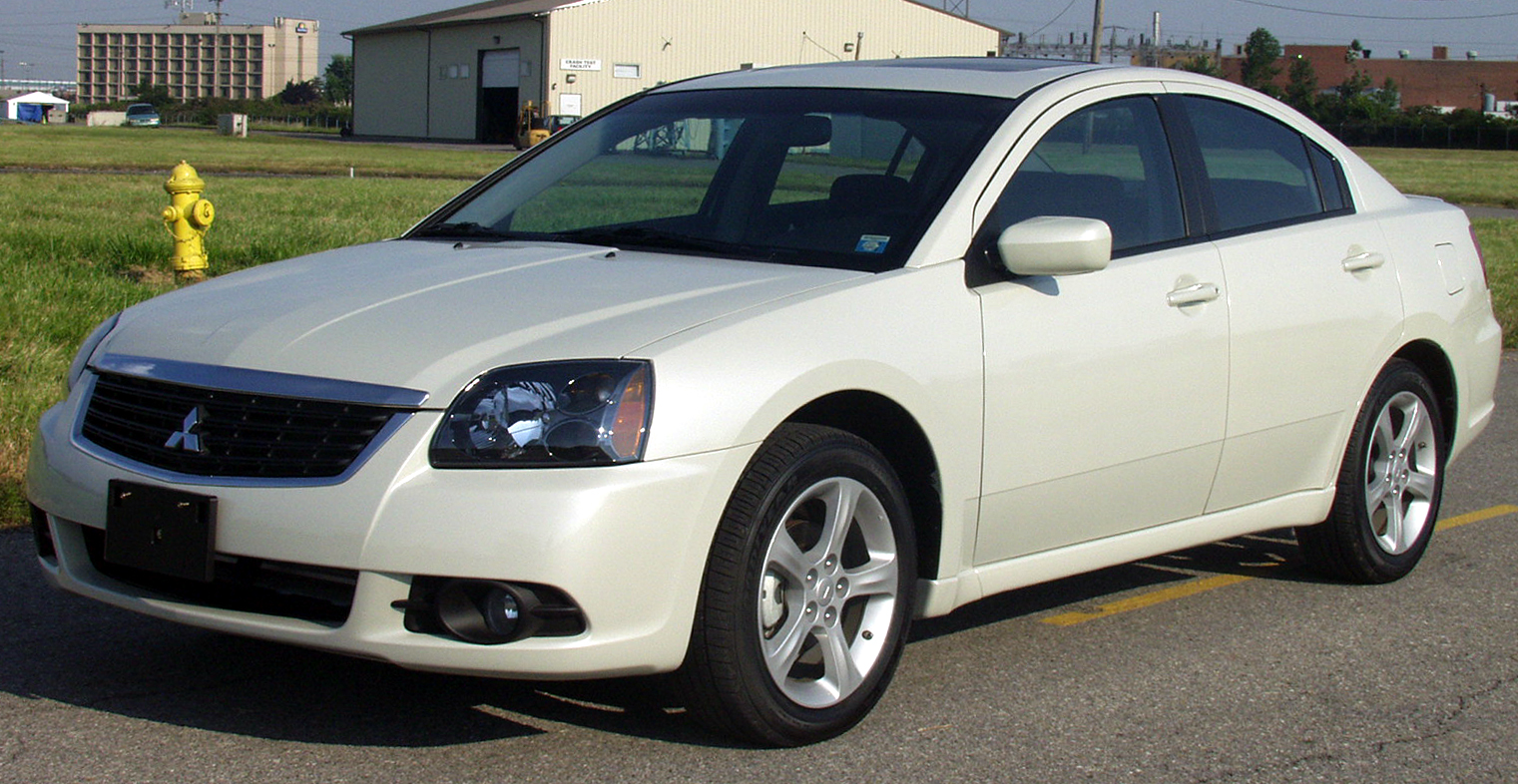
2009–2012 Mitsubishi Galant (US)

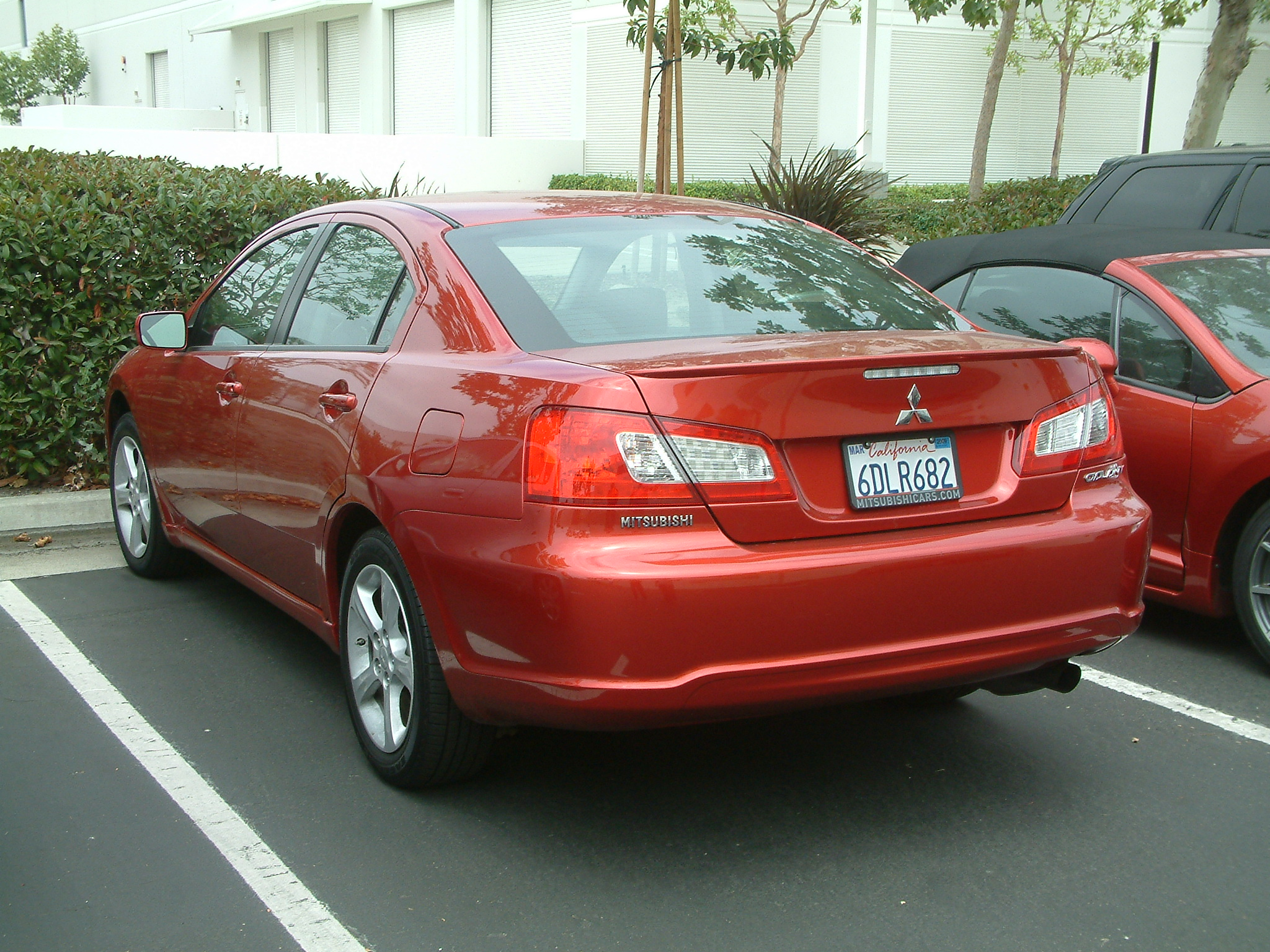
2009–2012 Mitsubishi Galant (US)

A four-cylinder Sport Edition was added for the 2009 model year. Galant Sport models include new standard factory value packages as standard. Sportronic automatic transmission is standard in all models, with a four-speed for four-cylinder engines and a five-speed for V6 engines.

=== East Asia ===
Mitsubishi also assembles and markets a Taiwan made version of the ninth-generation Galant. In Taiwan, this version is known as the Mitsubishi Grunder. Taiwan was one of the first regions outside the Americas to market the ninth generation vehicle, when the Galant Grunder was launched in December 2004 with a unique front end. It has a 162 PS (119 kW) version of the 2.4-liter engine and four-speed automatic (INVECS-II), and comes in either SEi format or as the better equipped EXi model.

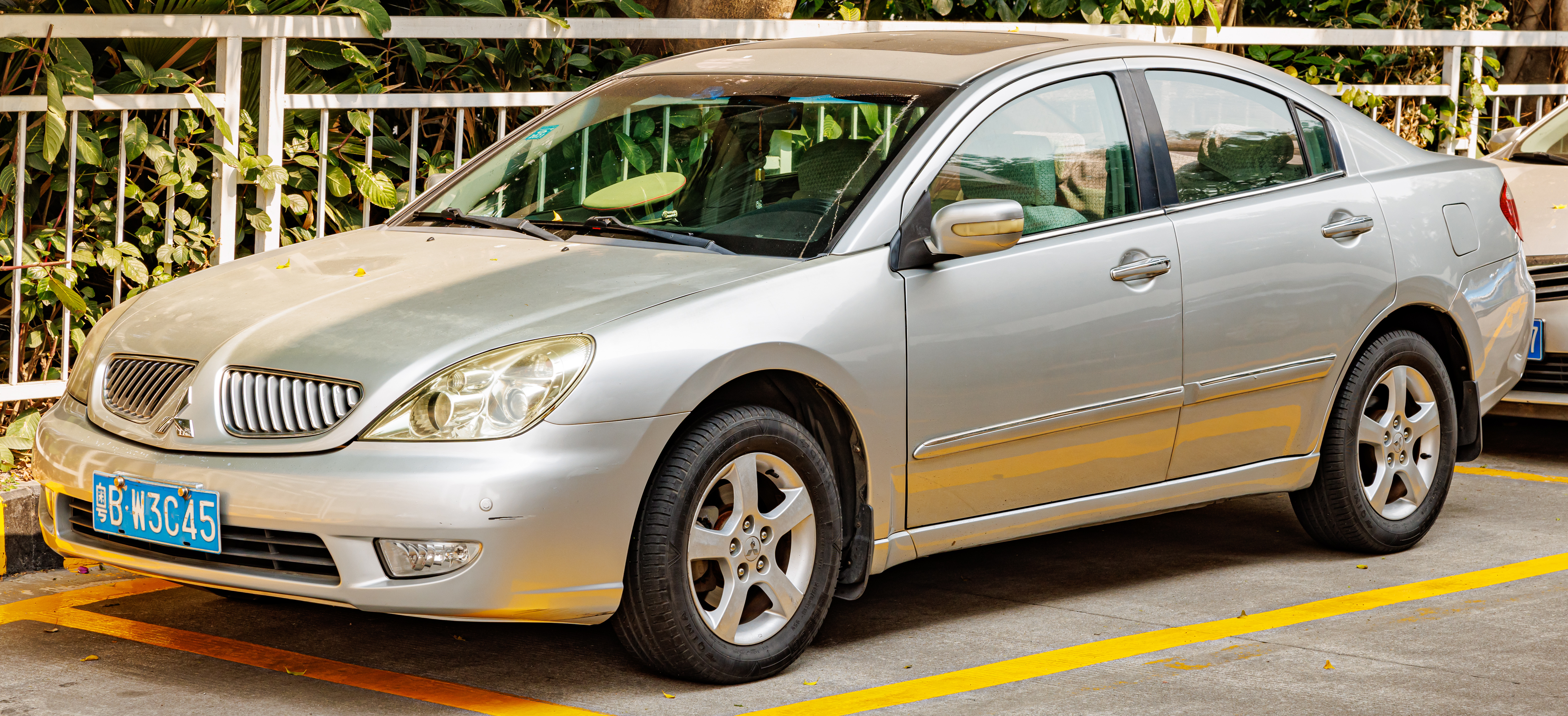
Chinese market Galant produced by Soueast-Mitsubishi

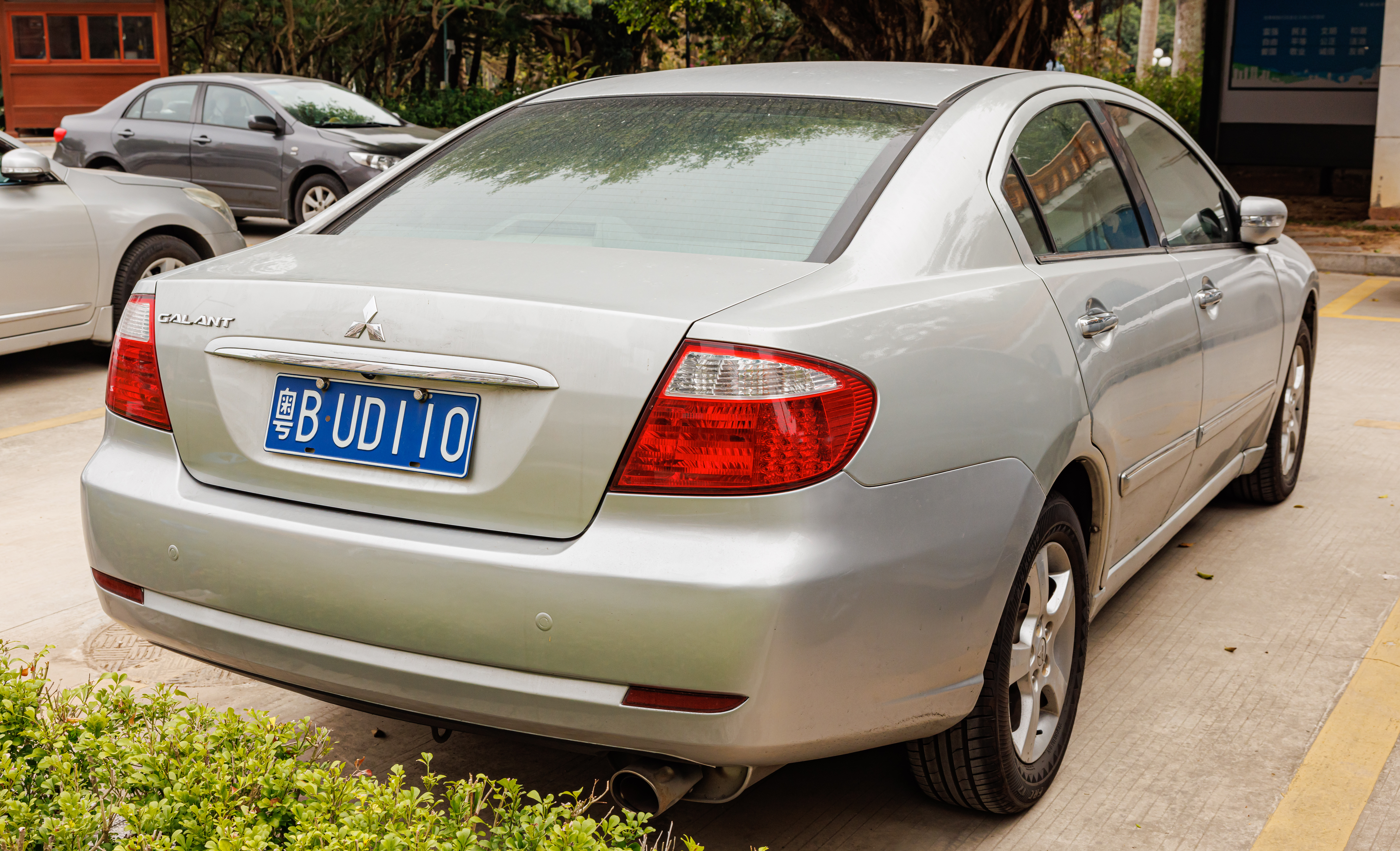
Rear view of the Chinese market Galant

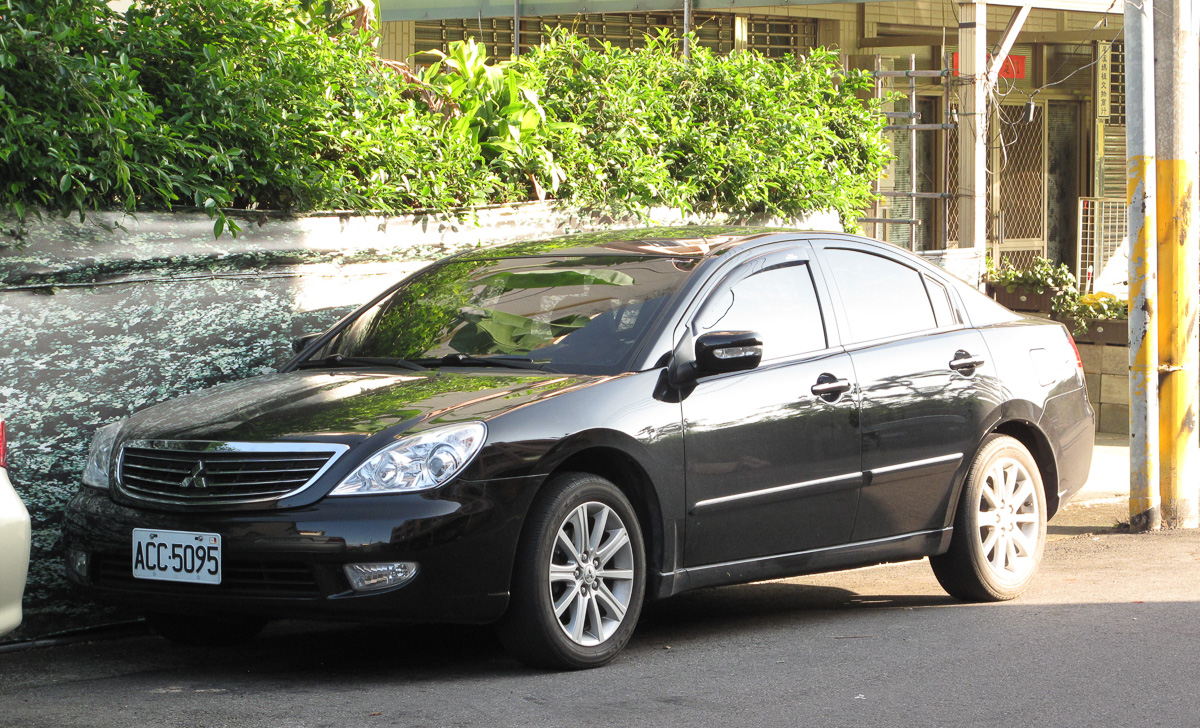
Taiwanese market Galant Grunder post-facelift

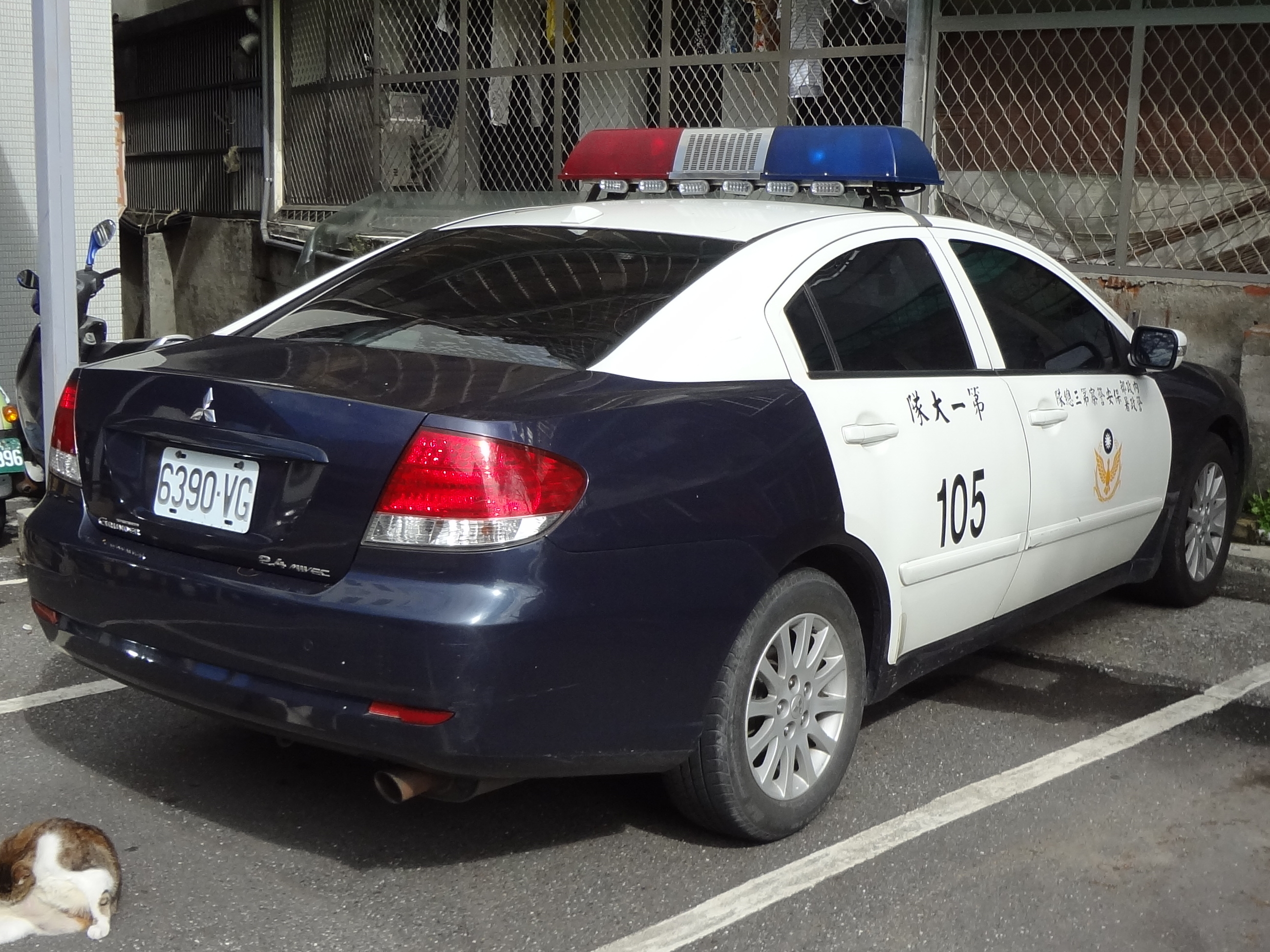
Rear view of the post-facelift Taiwanese market Galant Grunder serving as a police cruiser

This facelifted model is also sold in the Philippines from 2006 to 2009 as the Galant 240M, using Mitsubishi's 2.4L 4G69 MIVEC engine with Mitsubishi's 4-speed INVECS-II automatic transmission with Sportronic. It came with leather seats, remote keyless entry, eight-way power adjustment seat with variable lumbar support (driver side only), automatic climate control system, and an MP3-ready audio system. It only came in two color options; "Merlin Black" or "Excalibur Silver". In 2009, Mitsubishi Philippines replaced this with the all-new "SE" trim. It featured a redesigned grille, a new 12-speaker audio system with Dolby 5.1 Surround and DTS support, GPS-based navigation system, power adjustable mirrors, reverse camera among other features.

The Taiwanese-made Galant has also been sold by Soueast Motor in the People's Republic of China as the Galant since 2006. Models in China receive a 2.0-liter or 2.4-liter petrol engines, each paired with an automatic transmission.

=== Australia ===
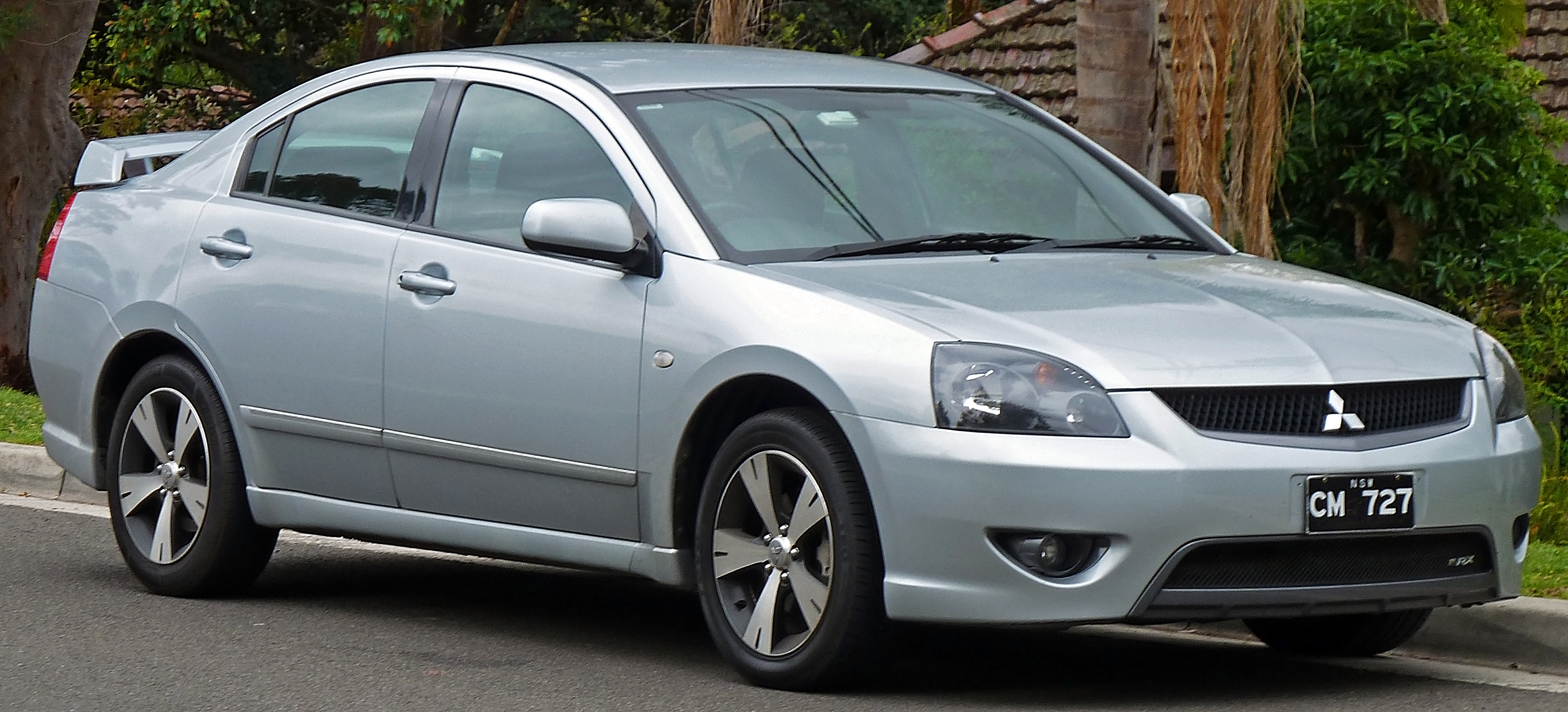
Mitsubishi 380

From 2005 to 2008, a localized version called the Mitsubishi 380 was manufactured in Australia for the Australian and New Zealand markets. No four cylinder engines were offered, the 380 being available only with the 3.8-liter 6G75 V6 with 175 kW (235 hp). This replaced the long-lived Magna line, and it was the last Mitsubishi car produced in Australia.

20 limited edition TMR models (Team Mitsubishi Ralliart) were made towards the end of the car's production at the Tonsley Park factory in Adelaide, running a supercharged version of the 3.8 6G75 with 230 kW (310 hp) and 442 N⋅m (326 lb⋅ft).

== Nameplate use with Lancer ==
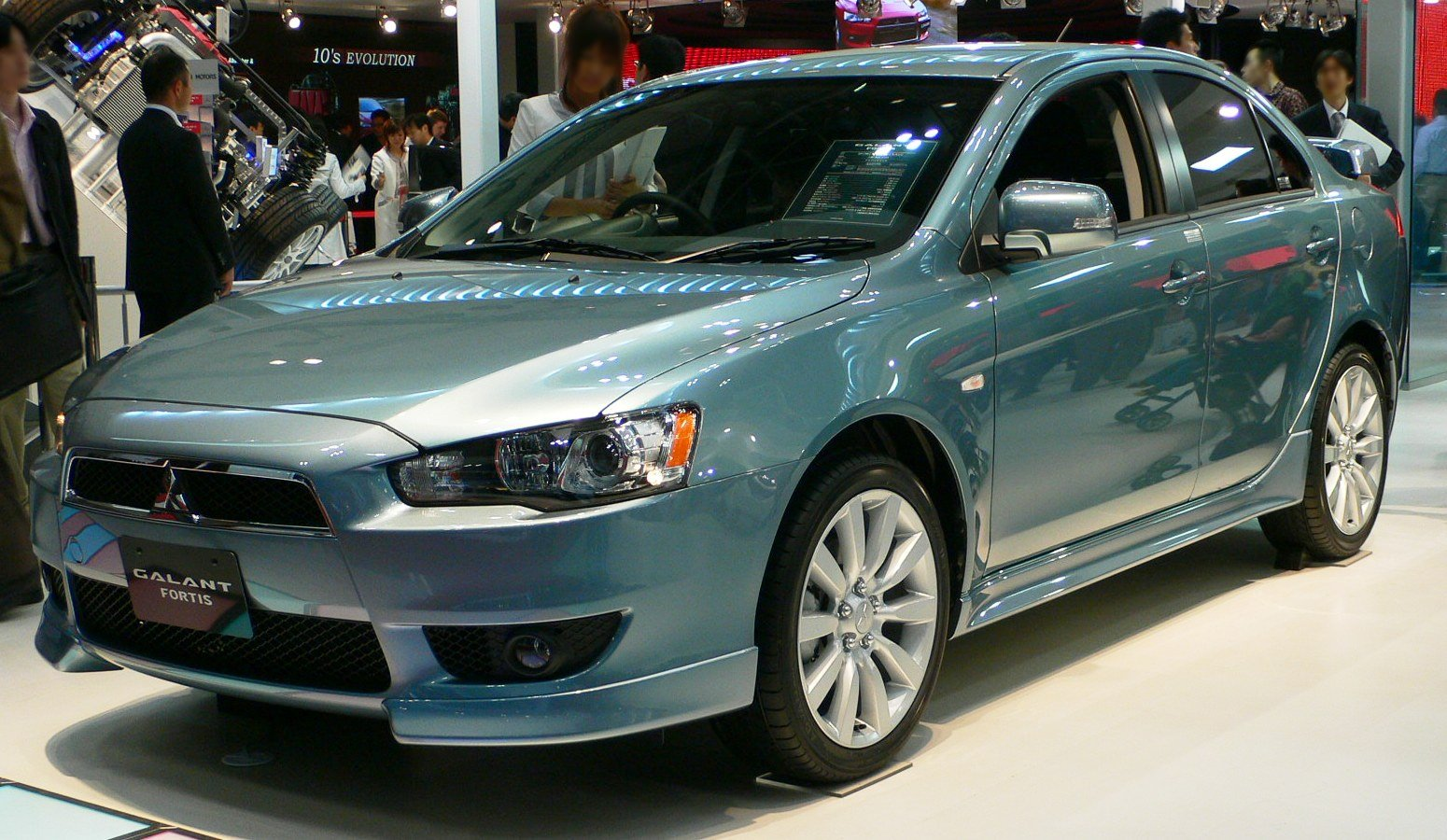
The Galant Fortis at the 2007 Tokyo Motor Show

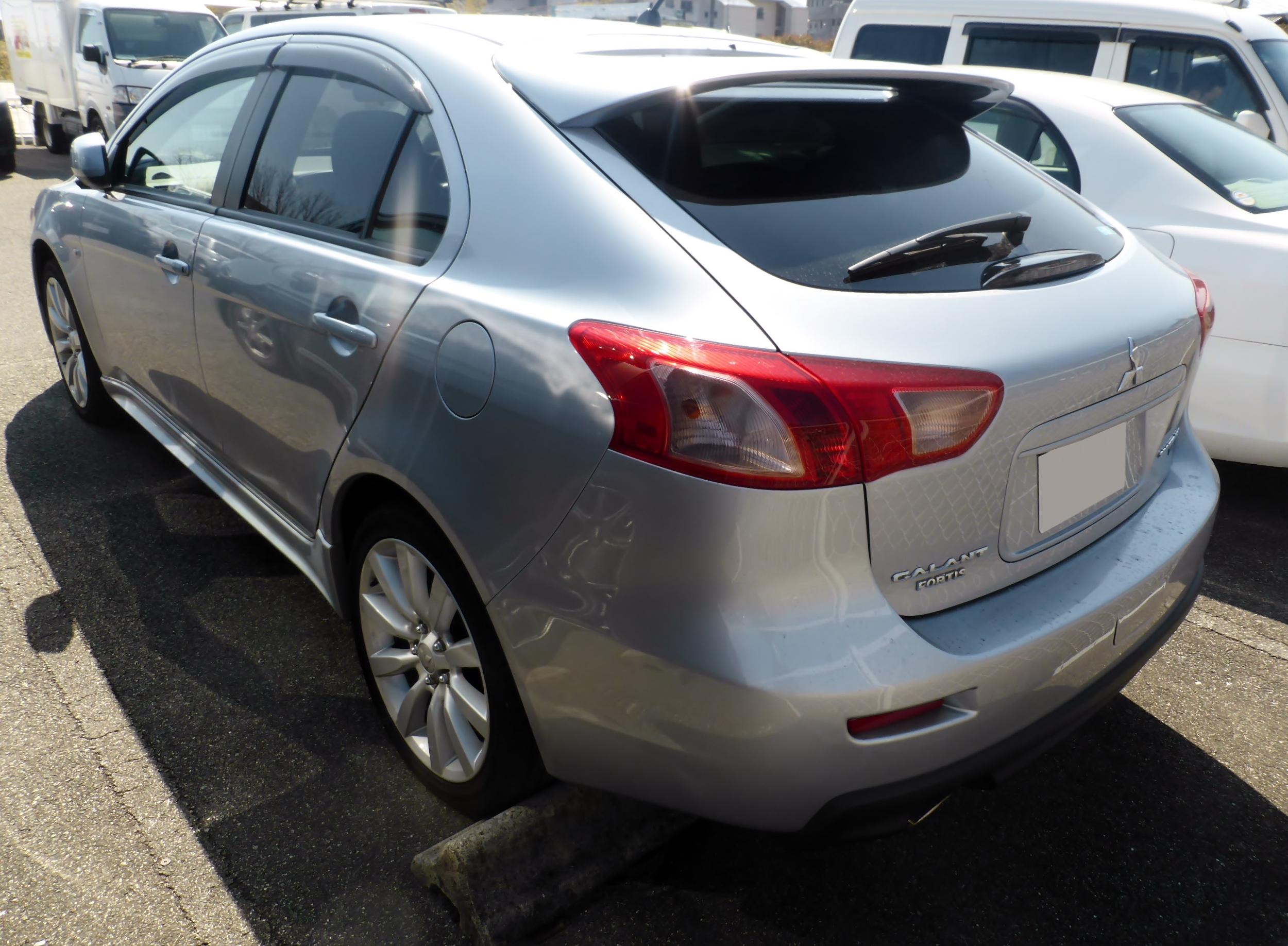
Galant Fortis Sportback rear view

With the exception of the Lancer Evolution X, the ninth generation Lancer was marketed as the Galant Fortis (Latin for strong, brave and resolute) in the Japanese domestic market. It comes in three trim levels: Exceed, Super Exceed, and Ralliart.

Between August 2015 to August 2017, GHK Motors (Mitsubishi Brunei) offered a version of the Lancer Sportback hatchback model under the name "Galant" in Brunei. The production of this model ceased at the end of August 2017 due to poor sales. Instead of increasing Mitsubishi's popularity, it took sales away from the Lancer.

== See also ==
- Mitsubishi Galant VR-4
