= Rise =

Rise or RISE may refer to:

== Arts, entertainment, and media ==
=== Fictional entities ===
- Rise: The Vieneo Province, an internet-based virtual world
- Rise FM, a fictional radio station in the video game Grand Theft Auto 3
- Rise Kujikawa, a video game character from Persona 4

=== Films ===
- Rise, a 2011 film with Andrew Stevens
- Rise (2014 film), an Australian film
- Fantastic Four: Rise of the Silver Surfer, often abbreviated as "Rise" in promotional material
- Rise: Blood Hunter, a 2007 horror/thriller film directed by Sebastian Gutierrez
- Rise (2022 American film), an American biographical sports-drama film
- Rise (2022 French film), a French comedy drama

=== Music ===
==== Performers ====
- Risë Stevens (1913–2013), American opera singer and actress
- Kwon Ri-se (1991–2014), South Korean singer, known by the stage name "Rise"
- Rise, an alias used by Paul Oakenfold and Steve Osborne
- R.I.S.E. or RISE, an alternative name used by Rising Appalachia

==== Albums ====
- Rise (Herb Alpert album), 1979
- Rise (Annabelle Chvostek album), 2012
- Rise (The Answer album), 2006
- Rise (Army of Me EP), a 2006 EP by Army of Me
- Rise (Bad Brains album), 1993
- Rise (Daryl Braithwaite album), 1990
- Rise (Building 429 album)
- Rise (Melissa Etheridge album), 2026
- Rise (Danny Gokey album), 2017
- Rise (Gabrielle album), 1999
- Rise (Hollywood Vampires album), 2019
- Rise (Samantha James album), 2007
- Rise (Lane 8 album), 2015
- Rise (Nosferatu album), 1993
- Rise (Mike Peters album), 1998
- Rise (René & Angela album), 1983
- Rise (Revolution Saints album), 2020
- Rise (RSO EP), 2017, by RSO (Richie Sambora and Orianthi)
- Rise (Shaggy album), 2012
- Rise (Anoushka Shankar album), 2005
- Rise (Skillet album), 2013
- Rise (A Skylit Drive album), 2013
- Rise (Sonny Fodera album), 2019
- Rise (Speed album), 1998
- Rise (Taeyang album), 2014
- Rise (The Texas Tenors album), 2017
- Rise (Joy Tobing album), 2005
- Rise (Eddie Turner album), 2005
- Rise (The Rasmus album), 2022
- Rise (Presence album), 2003
- Rise, a 2008 album by Anew Revolution
- Rise, a 2023 album by Kate Earl
- Rise, a 2021 EP by Kingfisher Sky
- Rise, a 1982 EP by Boyd Rice under the name NON

==== Songs ====
- "Rise" (instrumental), a 1979 composition from the same-named Herb Alpert album
- "Rise" (Eddie Amador song), 2000
- "Rise" (Jonas Blue song), 2018
- "Rise" (Daryl Braithwaite song), 1990
- "Rise" (Flobots song), 2008
- "Rise" (Gabrielle song), 2000
- "Rise" (Danny Gokey song), 2016
- "Rise" (Into a Circle song), 1985
- "Rise" (Samantha James song), 2006
- "Rise" (Katy Perry song), 2016
- "Rise" (Public Image Ltd song), 1986
- "Rise", a 2012 promotional single by the McClain Sisters
- "Rise", a 2018 promotional single for the 2018 League of Legends World Championship
- "Rise", a 2022 song by Ansonbean
- "Rise", a song by Apocalyptica from Cell-0
- "Rise", a song by Baboon from We Sing and Play
- "Rise", a song by Baroness from First
- "Rise", a song by Bleeding Through from Portrait of the Goddess
- "Rise", a song by Boyzone from BZ20
- "Rise", a song by The Cult from Beyond Good and Evil
- "Rise", a song by Disturbed from Believe
- "Rise", a song by Doves from Lost Souls
- "Rise", a song by Gojira from Terra Incognita
- "Rise", a song by Selena Gomez from Revival
- "Rise", a song by Grave from Back from the Grave
- "Rise", a song by Lost Frequencies, 2021
- "Rise", a song by Alison Moyet from Hoodoo
- "The Rise", a song by Oh, Sleeper from The Titan
- "Rise", a song by Origa from Ghost in the Shell: Stand Alone Complex O.S.T. 2
- "Rise", a song by Pantera from Vulgar Display of Power
- "Rise", a song by The Rasmus from Rise (The Rasmus album)
- "Rise", a song by Reks from Grey Hairs
- "Rise", a song by Freya Ridings
- "Rise", a song by Sixx:A.M. from Prayers for the Damned
- "Rise", a song by Skillet from Rise
- "Rise", a song by Eddie Vedder from Into the Wild
- "Rise", a song by Voivod from Phobos
- "Rise", a song by Whitechapel from Our Endless War
- "Rise", a song by Hans Zimmer from The Dark Knight Rises
- "Rise", a 2024 song by the Zutons from The Big Decider

==== Other uses in music ====
- Rise, a type of melodic motion
- Rise: London United, an annual anti-racism music festival held in London
- Rise Records, a record label

=== Television ===
- Rise (American TV series), a 2018 American drama television series
- Rise (Canadian TV series), a 2017 Canadian documentary television series
- "Rise" (Domina), a 2021 episode
- "Rise" (Star Trek: Voyager), the nineteenth episode of the third season of Star Trek: Voyager
- RI:SE, a breakfast television show in the UK

=== Other uses in arts, entertainment, and media ===
- RISE (kickboxing), a Japanese kickboxing promotion
- RISE (magazine), a former high school sports magazine owned by ESPN
- RISE (professional wrestling), a professional wrestling stable
- RISE (sculpture), a Belfast public art sculpture by Wolfgang Buttresss
- Rise: The Complete Newsflesh Collection, a 2016 collection by Mira Grant
- Monster Hunter Rise, a video game
- RISE: A Pop History of Asian America from the Nineties to Now, a book by Jeff Yang, Philip Wang and Phil Yu

== Business ==
- Rise Technology, a short-lived microprocessor manufacturer
- Rise FX, a visual effects vendor
- Rise (perfume), endorsed by Beyoncé
- Rise shaving cream, an American brand involved in advertising case law
- Rise Bar, sometimes called simply Rise, a gay bar in New York City

== Organizations ==
- Rise (non-governmental organization), an American civil rights organization for sexual assault survivors
- Criminal Sanctions Agency, abbreviated Rise, a Finnish government agency
- Research Institutes of Sweden (RISE), a network of Swedish state-owned research and technology organisations
- RISE – Scotland's Left Alliance, a Scottish eco-socialist party
- RISE (Ireland), a democratic socialist organisation
- Rise Mzansi, South Africa political social democratic party

== Places ==
- Rise, Agder, Norway, a village
  - Rise Station, a railway station at Rise
- Rise, East Riding of Yorkshire, England, a village and civil parish

== Technology ==
- CFM International RISE, an in-development open rotor aircraft engine
- RiSE (robot), a climbing robot developed by Boston Dynamics
- Mitsubishi RISE, Mitsubishi Motors' patented safety body construction system
- RISE-PAK, Relief and Information Systems for Earthquakes Pakistan, a website
- Rotation and Interior Structure Experiment, a radio science experiment by the InSight Mars lander
- Rise, a moon plush toy selected as the zero-gravity indicator and mascot of NASA's Artemis II mission

== Other uses ==
- Proofing (baking technique), a step in the preparation of yeast bread and other baked goods
- Grand Rapids Rise, a professional volleyball team
- RISE awards (Recognising Inspirational Scientists and Engineers), awarded by the Engineering and Physical Sciences Research Council
- Rise: A Feminist Book Project, a list of books
- Rise (arch), the height of an arch

== See also ==
- The Rise (disambiguation)
- Rice (disambiguation)
- Riise, surname
- Risa (disambiguation)
- Rise Again (disambiguation)
- Risen (disambiguation)
- Rize (disambiguation)
