= Risa =

Risa may refer to:

- Risa (given name), a feminine given name
- Risa (Star Trek), a fictional planet
- Radioiodinated serum albumin
- Recording Industry of South Africa
- Ribosomal Intergenic Spacer analysis

== See also ==
- Rise (disambiguation)
- Riza (disambiguation)
