= The Kut =

London-based rock multi-instrumentalist

- Occupations: Singer; songwriter; musician; businesswoman
- Instruments: Vocals; guitar; bass guitar; drum kit; musical keyboard
- Website: thekut.co.uk

The Kut (real name Princess Maha) is a London-based solo artist and multi-instrumentalist who became a double award winner in the UK Songwriting Contest in 2022. The Kut has received extensive radio and music press coverage from companies including Kerrang! Radio, Wonderland, SiriusXM, Classic Rock Magazine, Vive Le Rock, New Noise Magazine, Planet Rock, BBC Introducing, Kerrang!, Metal Hammer, and Q Magazine. The Kut is known for her distinctive, gritty style and for captivating songs, such as "ANIMO", "And 1 More...", "Bad Man" and charity Christmas single entitled "Waiting for Christmas".

Her debut album Valley of Thorns reached No. 7 in the UK Rock Albums Chart and No. 18 in the UK Independent Albums Chart and re-entered with the Digital and Vinyl release week ending 9 November 2018.

The follow up album GRIT was recorded with funding from Arts Council England and featuring The Kut's touring line up. The album charted at No. 1 in the UK Rock Albums Chart and at No. 5 in the UK Independent Albums Chart, release week ending 15 July 2022.

The Kut's sound is typified by Maha's song arrangements, contrasting smooth and raw vocals, choppy riffs and the dynamic guitar solos that secured her a full endorsement deal with Marshall Amplification. Influenced by the 1990s tones of Deftones, L7, Nirvana, the Distillers, Hole, Lunachicks, Incubus, Placebo as well as solo projects like Prince and Nine Inch Nails, The Kut is currently active on the UK and European grunge rock music scene, with live performances delivered by an all female cast of musicians. Usually performing as an all female trio, the live set up consists of Maha on vocals / guitar, bass / vocals and drums.

== Career ==
The debut EP Poisonest was released in 2005, although later deleted. In 2009, The Kut released two singles through Maha's independent label Criminal Records UK and Universal Records. This was followed by label interest from Warner Bros. Records but the experience led to a waiting period and eventual release hiatus. In this time however, The Kut continued to perform live at UK underground shows as well as high-profile events including London 2012 Olympics and London 2012 Paralympics as selected by the Teenage Rampage Foundation.

At the end of 2013, The Kut was voted in to the winning spots of the MTV Brand New Unsigned Poll for 2014. Soon, she released their first official record in approximately three years. The Make Up EP featured the two previous singles and three new tracks produced by James LeRock Loughrey, known for his work with Skindred, White Zombine, Def Leppard, Bjork and My Vitriol. Lead single "No Trace" was featured by Kerrang! Radio, BBC Introducing with the music video featured by Scuzz in the 'Most Wanted Rock Charts' reaching No. 4.

"Rock Paper Scissors" was the 2015 follow up EP, featuring four new tracks and a generally grittier, heavier sound. Both EPs were released by Maha's independent record label Criminal Records UK and have since sold out. The records were supported by the rock press and radio, including Planet Rock, BBC Introducing, Kerrang!, Metal Hammer, Big Cheese, Q Magazine and Classic Rock Magazine. A number of music videos gained heavy rotation on Scuzz TV, with additional playlist by AXS TV and MTV-U USA. The videos for singles "I Don't Need Therapy" and "Bad Man" were premiered by Kerrang!

In 2015, The Kut played the 'Dog's Bed Stage' at Download Festival 2015 and were voted as one of the best two acts appearing on that stage. 2015 also saw them open the main stages of Glastonbudget and Strummercamp Festival, alongside a stream of tour dates.

In 2016, the band performed a number of UK shows, including Glastonbudget, Camden Rocks Festival and Rebellion Festival alongside 37 summer UK tour dates. At the end of 2016, The Kut also performed their first international shows in Germany with four concerts during December, and in January, they were featured in Kerrang! Magazine's Breakthrough Acts of 2017 List. Their touring programme included a visit to six countries in April 2017 – the "Spring Tour 2017" saw the live outfit travel to and perform in Italy, the Czech Republic, Germany, Belgium, the Netherlands and back for shows on British home soil.

The Kut released The Kut EP on 500 limited edition picture disc vinyls for Record Store Day on 22 April 2017 through Criminal Records UK and Cargo Records. The record was featured at number 4 in Kerrang! Magazines Top 10 Record Store Day Releases, alongside Mallory Knox, Babymetal, Bullet For My Valentine, Pearl Jam, Ginger Wildheart, Gerard Way, Against Me and more.

The Kut's debut album, "Valley of Thorns", containing 10 successful tracks, which was released by Criminal Records, reached Number 7 in the UK Rock Album Charts, and Number 18 in the UK Independent Album Charts.

In November 2020, The Kut announced that a charity Christmas single, "Waiting for Christmas", would be released in aid of Red Cross. The single, although pre-empted to be an underdog, later made the MTV USA playlist, was selected by Music Choice USA and aired on the Christmas Special of LATV. The single simultaneously became No. 3 in the [NACC] Most Accessed 'Top Singles' heat seeker chart. The single would later be highlighted by the Official Charts Company website as an Official Contender for Christmas Number 1, finally placing at Number 10 in the UK Top 100 Physical Sales Chart and at Number 65 in the Top 100 Sales Chart, for the week 25–31 December 2020.

Post pandemic, The Kut returned to live stages with a headline set at Isle of Wight Festival on River Stage and took part in the Music Venue Trust National Lottery Tour to #ReviveLive Music, later joining US high-voltage rockers Electric Six on UK Tour Dates.

In April 2022, The Kut announced that their second album, GRIT, would be released and feature the collective of musicians that she had toured with. A concept record focusing on independence, passion and purpose mirroring The Kut's journey as a self-releasing independent artist, GRIT debuted at Number 1 in the Official UK Rock Album chart, and Number 5 in The Independent Album Chart.

The record also charted in six other official UK charts and became the first Number 1 rock album to feature women on vocals, guitars, bass and drums since the genre chart formed in 1994. The album includes the earlier singles ANIMO (meaning courage) and Satellite, the former winning the UK Songwriting Contest in two categories. The latest music video 'And 1 More...' was filmed at Gods Own Junkyard in London and directed by Mike Gripz. Summer and Autumn tour dates celebrating the release of GRIT took place in the summer of 2022 and continued through September.

In late November 2022, the Kut released new single "Fun When You're Winning" in support of England's upcoming chances in the FIFA World Cup 2022. Described by Maha as a "psych up song", the single had already featured on EFL Highlights and on English Premier League highlights on Talksport. Moreover, the song has also gained coverage in other sports, being played on Sky Sports Cricket and Diamond League Athletics also.

== Members ==
Princess Maha is the only consistent recording and touring member of The Kut. Having studied psychosis-related illness at University of Roehampton alongside The Kut, she earned a PhD in Positive Schizotypy related research in January 2019. Her first publication was in the Journal of Personality and Individual Differences and discussed new measures for positive schizotypy.

The Kut performs live with a collective of musicians. Long term touring drummers have included Fidan Hassan (2009-2013) and Diana Bartmann (2015-date). Long term touring bass players; Elvira Zaera (pre 2009) and Alison (2009-2013), Stella Vie (2017-2019) and a number of additional female session bassists: Dany Jones, Hannah Aero, Jennifer Sanin. There have also been one off bass performances by Joy Guest, Sid Rose, Eli Karali (bass / rhythm guitar) and honorary female, Kevin O'Shea. Pre-2009 drummers have included Nuria Glendal, Jade Wilson, Christina Borgi, Amil Smith and session drummers, Violet Stow, Amanda Dal, Lauren O'Donnell and Robert O'Shea (2013-2015). In 2011, The Kut performed an 'Unplugged Tour' featuring Stacey Douglas on acoustic guitar, and Sophie Haynes on cello. On this set of UK dates Maha often switched between playing guitar and drums. 2020 Christmas single 'Waiting For Christmas' featured string players Kate Shortt (cello) and Celia Pedregal (violin). In 2022 Jayke Turl who joined initially joined tours as road crew became an official member of the collective.

The recent album GRIT features The Kut on vocals/lead guitar as well as bass and drums on two album tracks. On the record she is joined by Diana Bartmann (drums), Jennifer Sanin (bass/vocals), Hannah Aero (bass), Jayke Turl (guitar/vocals), alongside Alison (guitar/bass/piano/vocals) and Violet Stow (drums) who also featured on the debut record Valley of Thorns.

Princess Maha was born in London and grew up in Blackpool. Still, Maha expresses her fondness for the North, saying "you can take the girl out of the North, but you can't take the North out of the girl."

Maha formed her first band at the age of 14 and would go on to win the Battle of the Bands in Lancashire. However, her drummer later became hospitalised with schizophrenia, which prompted Maha to study psychology, which she eventually earned a doctorate in. Living in London and inspired by London graffiti art, she adopted the tag 'The Kut' and began to tour with a band, adopting their gritty style due to there "a real lack of new grunge bands" Maha is passionate about women and feminism in music, stating that she hoped The Kut's status as an all-girl band "played a role in changing limiting gender stereotypes at the same time".
