= Rize (disambiguation) =

Rize is a city and the capital of Rize Province in Turkey.

Rize may also refer to:

- Rize (album), R&B singer Dwele's 2000 self-released demo
- Rize (band), a Japanese rock band
- Rize (film), a 2005 documentary by David LaChapelle about krumping and clowning
  - Rize (soundtrack)
- Rize Province, a province of north-east Turkey
  - Rize tea, a kind of black tea produced in Rize Province
- Rize (river), a river in France
- Rize Shinba, Japanese manga author and illustrator
- "Rize", a song by the Outlawz
- A brand name for Clotiazepam, a sedative drug
- A slang term for ingesting THC using a Vaporizer
- Rize (Is the Order a Rabbit?), a character in the manga series Is the Order a Rabbit?

== See also ==
- Rize of the Fenix, a 2012 album by the American rock band Tenacious D
- Riza, a metal cover protecting a religious icon
- Riize, a South Korean boy band
- Rise (disambiguation)
- Rice (disambiguation)
- Rza (disambiguation)
- Hot Rize (disambiguation)
