= Risen =

Risen may refer to:

== Arts and entertainment ==
- Risen (series), a video game series
  - Risen (video game), a 2009 game
- Risen (2016 film), a 2016 American biblical drama film
- Risen (2010 film), a 2010 Welsh film
- Risen (The Awakening album), a 1997 gothic rock album
- Risen (O.A.R. album), a 2001 rock album
- "Risen" (song), a 2019 rock song
- The Risen, a tabletop role-playing game book

== People ==
- Arnie Risen (1924–2012), American basketball player
- Clay Risen, 21st-century American journalist and historian
- James Risen (born 1955), American journalist and historian

== Other uses ==
- Risen Peak, a mountain in Antarctica
- Swiss Excellence Risen, a Swiss ultralight aircraft design

== See also ==
- Rise (disambiguation)
- RISN
- Rizen (disambiguation)
