= The Cureheads =

British tribute band for The Cure

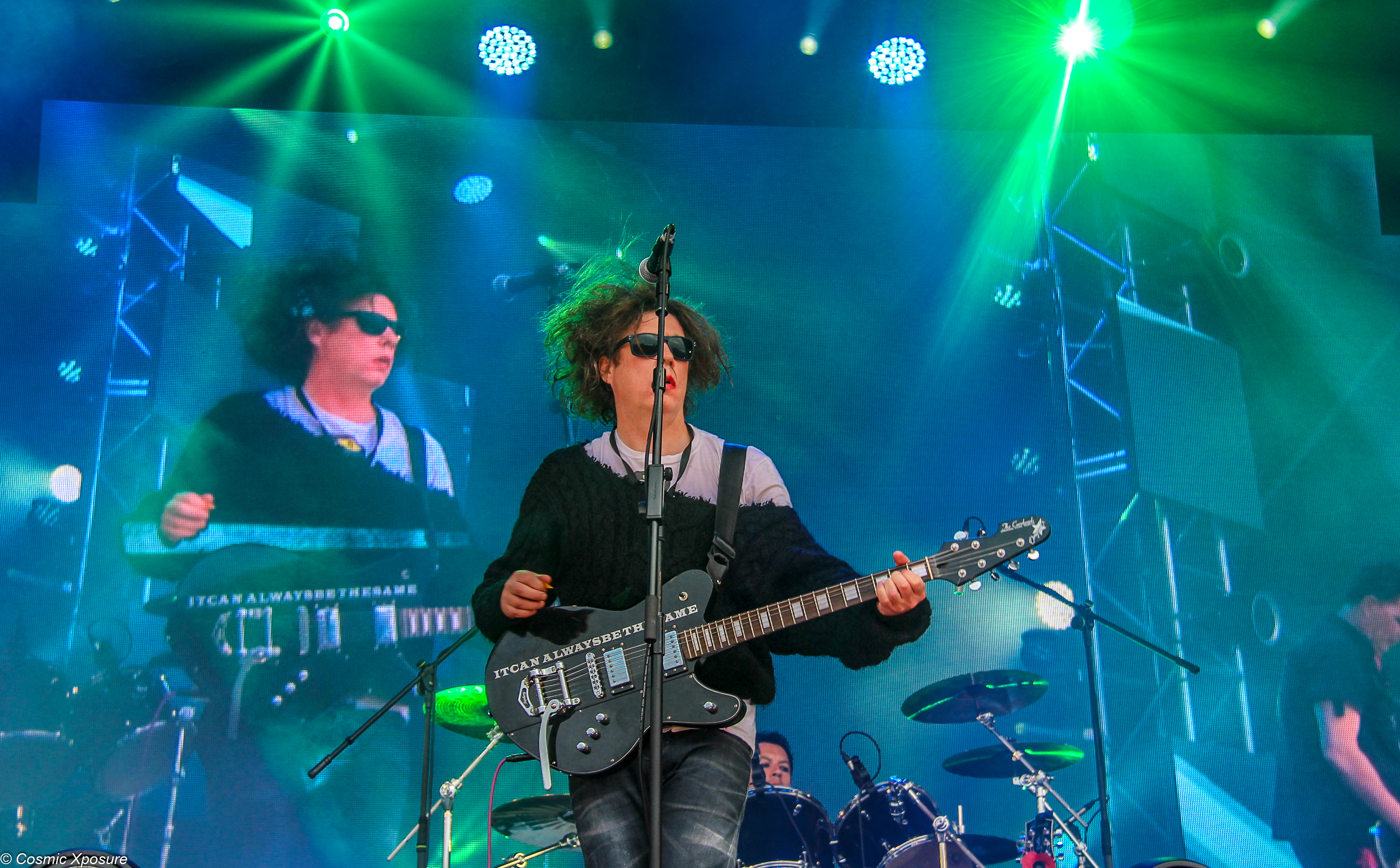
- The Cureheads live at Glastonbudget 2018

Background information
- Origin: London, England
- Genres: Gothic rock, post-punk
- Years active: 1990–present
- Spinoffs: Siouxsie and the Budgies
- Members: Gary Clarke; Philip Mayor; Nigel Gorman; Calum Ward
- Website: www.thecureheads.co.uk

The Cureheads are the longest-running and the most known tribute band dedicated to The Cure. They recreate The Cure’s live sound and visual style in performance.

== Background ==
The Cureheads were formed in 1990 in London, England by Gary Clarke, then lead singer of Nosferatu and later vocalist of The Hiram Key. The Cureheads name is taken from the Irish slang term for anyone with the "1980s mop-haired 'Gothic' look". They were originally known as "Fat Bob & The Cureheads" until 2000. The name change was suggested by Ita Martin of Fiction Records to avoid offending The Cure.

== Touring ==
The Cureheads played their first show in Stockholm in July 1990 at Frietzfronten, an underground bar on St. Eriksgatan 89 owned by a Swedish political party. In the same year, they appeared on ZTV, a Swedish music television channel, performing live at the Stockholm Water Festival. Their first large headline show was at the WGT in 1995, when they were known as Fat Bob & The Cureheads.

Since 1990, The Cureheads have performed at venues including The Vic Theater in Chicago, Camden Palace in London, Temple Bar in Dublin , CBGB in New York, and Razzmatazz (club) in Barcelona.

In 2007, Charlie Simpson of Busted booked The Cureheads to perform as a wedding gift for the bass player of his new band, Fightstar. The band played a one-hour set and were joined onstage by Simpson for a performance of The Cure’s "Inbetween Days". The band claim that Simpson fell off the stage and passed out during the last verse.

In 2010, The Cureheads played to 10,000 people in Chile at the Teatro Caupolicán in Santiago, the former national basketball stadium. The show was recorded for national television and covered by national TV news, as The Cure had not performed in Chile up to that point despite having a large fanbase there.

In 2012, The Cureheads played in Paraguay and Argentina ahead of The Cure performing there in 2013.

The band has toured in the UK, the US, continental Europe, and South America, playing festivals and opening for acts including Echo and The Bunnymen and The Pretenders at Guilfest, Bilbao BBK Live (opening for Depeche Mode), The Isle of Wight Festival (2016, 2017 & 2021), Glastonbudget (2017 & 2019), Glastonbarry 2022, and the Roskilde Festival in Denmark.

=== Current shows ===
Since 2018, The Cureheads have toured with a double-headline tribute show titled The Story of Goth. The first half of the show features a set of songs by Siouxsie and the Banshees performed under the name Siouxsie and the Budgies and fronted by vocalist Ceri Anne Gregory. Following an interval, the same musicians return as The Cureheads, with lead vocals taken over by Gary Clarke, to perform a set dedicated to The Cure.

== Line-ups ==
Current and past line-ups of The Cureheads have included members from various Gothic rock bands such as Nosferatu, Killing Miranda, and The Essence. Andy Anderson, an original drummer from The Cure, joined the band in August 2012, but left later that year after failing to appear at the airport for the start of their South American tour in November. The Cureheads stated that they had not heard from Anderson since.

Ron Howe, the original saxophonist on The Cure's Head on the Door album, frequently guests with the band. Jeremy Hayward, guitar technician for The Cure, was also a member of The Cureheads.

== Media coverage ==
In 2021, Record Collector magazine published an interview with Gary Clarke in a special edition entitled Record Collector Presents: The Cure. The interview discusses the history of The Cureheads and their experiences over the previous 32 years.

The band is featured in the 2023 book Curepedia: An A-Z of The Cure by music journalist Simon Price. The book highlights the group's status as a staple of the subculture surrounding The Cure.

== Current members ==
- Gary Clarke – Vocals and Guitar (as Robert Smith)
- Philip Mayor – Guitar, Bass VI (Cureheads: Porl Thompson; Siouxsie and the Budgies: John McGeoch)
- Nigel Gorman – Bass Guitar (Cureheads: Simon Gallup; Siouxsie and the Budgies: Steven Severin)
- Calum Ward – Drums (Cureheads: Boris Williams; Siouxsie and the Budgies: Budgie)
- Vlad Ivanov – Keyboards (as Roger O'Donnell)
- Ceri Anne Gregory – Vocals (as Siouxsie Sioux)

== Previous members ==
- Sean Carey (1994–1995) – Bass
- Martin Aylward (1994–1998) – Drums
- Sid (1995–1998; The Sisters Of Murphy) – Bass
- Andy Holmes (1995–1996; Rhombus (band)) – Guitar
- Rik (1994–1996) – Keyboards
- Andy (1998; Waking Dream) – Keyboards
- Simon Briggs (1998; Waking Dream) – Guitar
- Billy Freedom (2000–2001; Queen Adreena) – Drums
- Julian Shah Taylor (2000–2005; Drink Me) – Guitar
- Jeremy Hayward (2001–2005; guitar tech for Robert Smith) – Guitar
- Jeff Tan (2002–2010) – Keyboards
- Marian "Superstar" Filarski (2004–2012; Freex Family) – Bass
- Andy Anderson (2012) – Drums; original drummer from The Cure
- Irish Dave (2012–2013; Killing Miranda) – Bass
- Darren Bottrill (2002–2013) – Guitar
- Belle Star (2007–2016; Nosferatu) – Drums
- Fran Dima (2015–2017) – Guitar
- Vlad Ivanov (2016–2019) – Keyboards
- Sean Flude (2018–2024) – Bass
- Jordan Turner (2022–2024) – Drums
- Roi Robertson (Mechanical Cabaret & Killing Joke) – Keyboards
- Darren Keane (now legacy keyboard/voice programmer for Roger O'Donnell) – Keyboards
