= Rizen =

Rizen may refer to:

- Rizen (gospel group), an American gospel group
- The Rizen, a 2017 British horror film
- Eric Lynch (born 1978), nickname Rizen, American professional poker player
- Clotiazepam, trade name Rizen, a drug

== See also ==
- Risen (disambiguation)
- Ryzen
