= Nosferatu (band) =

English gothic rock band

- Origin: United Kingdom
- Genre: Gothic rock
- Years active: 1988–present
- Labels: Possession, Cleopatra, Hades, Dark Fortune
- Members: Damien DeVille; Tim Vic
- Past members: Sapphire Aurora; Vlad Janicek; Gary Clarke; Louis DeWray; Belle Star; Niall Murphy; Dante Savarelle; Dominic LaVey; Doc Miton; Stefan Diablo; Thom; Chrys Columbine
- Website: www.officialnosferatu.co.uk

Nosferatu are an English gothic rock band. As of 2025, the members are Damien DeVille (lead guitar), Tim Vic (vocals and guitar), Olde Bones (drums) and Smiffy (bass guitar).

== History ==
Nosferatu were formed in March 1988 by guitarist Damien DeVille, bassist Vlad Janicek, and vocalist Sapphire Aurora. In 1990, they debuted with the track "Bloodlust" on a compilation album. Ex Grenadier Guard Gary Clarke (The Cureheads) took over from Sapphire & fronted the band on their first Uk tour, opening for Every New Dead Ghost. Clarke left in late 1990 to start The Cureheads. In 1991, they recorded The Hellhound EP with vocalist Louis DeWray replacing Clarke. In 1992, Dave Roberts of the gothic rock group Sex Gang Children wanted Nosferatu to release a compilation of their singles so far under the Cleopatra Records label, but the band agreed to record new songs towards their debut album Rise in 1993. Afterwards, Niall Murphy replaced DeWray on vocals for their Halloween shows.

In 1994, Nosferatu released a compilation of early recordings called Legend and their second studio album The Prophecy. Afterwards, Murphy was replaced by Dominic LaVey, and Janicek left the band, with Dante Savarelle replacing. The group signed with Hades Records, and released Prince of Darkness in 1996. In 1998, the group released Lord of the Flies with bassist Doc Milton replacing Savarelle, and featured guest drummer Rat Scabies formerly of The Damned.

Bassist Stefan Diablo replaced Milton and the band worked on the album Re Vamped, released in 1999. Re Vamped had remixes and some new tracks. In 2000, they released the live album Reflections Through a Darker Glass. They released another compilation album The Best of Nosferatu, Vol. 1 Louis DeWray officially rejoined the band in 2005, and in 2011, they released the album Wonderland under Dark Fortune Records.

In 2015, vocalist Louis DeWray left the band and Tim Vic replaced him.

== Discography ==
=== Studio albums ===
- Rise (1993)
- The Prophecy (1994)
- Prince of Darkness (1996)
- Lord of the Flies (1998)
- Wonderland (2011)

=== Compilation albums ===
- Legend (1994)
- Re Vamped (1999)
- The Best of Nosferatu: Volume 1: The Hades Years

=== Live albums ===
- Reflections Through A Darker Glass (2000)

=== Singles ===
Some of these singles were also released as EPs, 12", CD and cassette

- "The Hellhound" (1991)
- "Vampyres Cry" (1992)
- "Diva" (1992)
- "Inside The Devil" (1993)
- "Savage Kiss" (1993)

== Members ==
Current members

- Damien DeVille (1988–present) – guitars
- Tim Vic (2015–present) – vocals

Former members

- Sapphire Aurora (1988–1990) – vocals
- Vlad Janicek (1988–1994) – bass, keyboards
- Gary Clarke (Jan 1990–Dec 1990)
- Louis DeWray (1991–1993, 2005–2015) – vocals
- Belle Star (2007–2023) – drums
- Niall Murphy (1993–1994) – vocals
- Dante Savarelle (1994–1998) – bass
- Dominic LaVey (1995–2002) – vocals
- Chrys Columbine (2006–2010) - piano and keyboards
- Doc Milton (1998–2011) – bass
- Stefan Diablo (2011–2016) – bass
- Thom (2016–2023) – bass

== The Nosferatu ==
In 2019, Vlad Janicek and Louis DeWray formed The Nosferatu. In an interview with Absolution, Janicek said it was after The Prophecy tour when DeVille "left the band" and "What followed was 1-2 years of legal stupidity during which Damien decided to form a completely new band and call it Nosferatu. After taking very expensive legal counseling l was told that l could not stop him as technically we both owned the name 50/50 and could both use it." They brought in Chris Clark who had also played briefly with Nosferatu.

The Nosferatu played their first show at The Underworld in Camden, London in November 2019 and their first overseas show in February 2020 at Temple Rock Club in Athens, Greece. In 2023, the band embarked on an extensive European and American tour, playing headline concerts in Mexico, Czech Republic, Portugal, Ireland, Spain and Italy, and at Whitby Gothic Festival U.K supporting New Model Army, and at the prestigious NCN Festival in Germany. The Mexican shows the band headlined are notable as debut performances of songs from the Rise album and the first time any version of the band has performed in North America.

The band are currently writing and recording songs for their debut album under The Nosferatu name, and have upcoming 2024 shows at Castle Party Festival in Poland, and in Athens, Greece.
