= Prince of Darkness (Nosferatu album) =

Studio album by Nosferatu
- Released: September 1996
- Genre: Gothic rock
- Labels: Cleopatra Records, Hades
- Producers: Dominic LaVey, Damien DeVille, Doc. Milton

Nosferatu chronology
The Prophecy (1994)	Prince of Darkness (1996)	Lord of the Flies (1998)

Prince of Darkness is the third studio album by the English Gothic rock band Nosferatu. It is the band's first album to feature lead vocalist Dominic LaVey. The album was released September 1996 by Cleopatra Records in the United States and Canada, and in August 1996 in the United Kingdom and Germany on Hades Records.

== Track listing ==
No.	Title	Length
1.	"Eye of the Watcher"
2.	"Ravage"
3.	"Uninvited Guest"
4.	"The Haunting (Main Mix)"
5.	"Into the Night"
6.	"The Passing"
7.	"Graveyard Shift"
8.	"The Haunting (Swamp Mix)"
9.	"The Hunger"
10.	"Invocation"

== Credits and personnel ==
- Damien DeVille: Lead guitar, keyboards and drum machine programming
- Dominic LaVey: Vocals and keyboards
- Dante Savarelle: Bass Guitar
