= Lord of the Flies (album) =

Studio album by Nosferatu
- Released: 31 March 1998
- Genre: Gothic rock
- Label: Cleopatra Records in USA and Canada; Hades Records in UK, Germany, Austria and Switzerland
- Producer: Dominic LaVey, Damien DeVille, Doc. Milton

Nosferatu chronology
Prince of Darkness (1996)	Lord of the Flies (1998)	Wonderland (2011)

Lord of the Flies is the fourth full-length studio album by English gothic rock band Nosferatu. It was released in April 1998 by Cleopatra Records in the U.S.A and Canada and by Hades Records in the U.K., Germany, Austria and Switzerland. It is the band's 5th best selling album with worldwide sales realising in excess of 5,000 copies.

== Title ==
The title of the album repeats the name of the Nobel Prize-winning author William Golding's famous novel Lord of the Flies about a group of children going wild on a deserted island and committing atrocities there. They eventually start worshipping a dead pig's head, calling it Lord of the Flies, which is a translation of the name of Beelzebub, a satanic being.

NOSFERATU's "Lord of The Flies" album was recorded and mixed at House in The Woods Residential Studio, Bletchingley Surrey in July and August 1997. Rat Scabies formerly of The Damned, drummed on the songs "Witching Hour", "Torturous" and "Ascension" and was driven to the recording studio by Segs (The Ruts) due to Rat having severed a tendon in his thumb. The late and GREAT Simon "Doc" Milton engineered, recorded and co-produced this album, he also played bass guitar on it as Dante Savarelle had recently left. The lineup for this album therefore being Dominic LaVey (vocals), Simon "Doc" Milton (bass), Damien DeVille (guitar) and Rat Scabies (drums). Initially this album was due to be released in fall 1997 in time for the festive season, but due to delays with artwork, it missed this date, lost a significant number of USA pre-sales and appeared in April 1998.on Hades Records (UK) and Cleopatra Records (USA). UK sales were hampered due to the initial UK distributor Draconis going into receivership in 1998 only 3 weeks after release, but both Rough Trade and Southern Distribution took over and kept the album in circulation. EFA Medien GmBH distributed this album in Germany but due to them going into receivership in 1999, distribution of the CD ceased in this territory. It was released digitally on all platforms in 2006 and plans are being made by Dark Fortune Records to re-release this classic album on vinyl some 22 years after release and to help celebrate NOSFERATUs 34th anniversary.

== Track listing ==
No.	Title	Length
1.	"Torturous"
2.	"Ascension"
3.	"Tempest"
4.	"Witching Hour"
5.	"Gauntlet"
6.	"Six Feet Below"
7.	"Darkness Brings"
8.	"Lord of the Flies"

== Credits and personnel ==
- Doc Milton - Bass guitar
- Damien DeVille - Lead guitar, Hammond organ, keyboard and drum machine programming
- Dominic Lavey - Vocals and keyboard programming
- Rat Scabies - Drums on "Torturous", "Ascension" & "Witching Hour"
