= The Prophecy (Nosferatu album) =

Studio album by Nosferatu
- Released: November, 1994 in UK & Jan 1995 in USA
- Genre: Gothic rock
- Labels: Possession Records in UK & Germany, Cleopatra Records in USA
- Producers: Niall Murphy, Damien DeVille, Doc. Milton

Nosferatu chronology
| Rise (1993) | The Prophecy (1994) | Prince of Darkness (1996) |

Professional ratings
Review scores
| Source | Rating |
|---|---|
| Allmusic | 4/5 stars |

The Prophecy is the second studio album by English Gothic rock band Nosferatu. It is the band's first album to feature lead vocalist Niall Murphy. The album reached Number 14 in the UK Independent Charts in November 1994. It is the band's 2nd best selling album realising in excess of 13,000 copies sold worldwide. The US release contains an extra track titled Sucker for Love. Both European and US version feature a hidden track, The Phantom.In Europe, this album was available on double vinyl as well as CD. Limited Edition promotional cassette versions were distributed free at selected venues. Nosferatu's most famous song The Keepers Call is featured on this album and has gone on to sell over 46,000 copies worldwide.

== Track listing ==
| No. | Title | Length |
|---|---|---|
| 1. | "Requiem" |
| 2. | "Farewell My Little Earth" |
| 3. | "Fever" |
| 4. | "The Keepers Call" |
| 5. | "Thrill Killer" |
| 6. | "Time of Legends" |
| 7. | "Shadowmaker" |
| 8. | "Savage Kiss" |
| 9. | "Grave Desires" |
| 10. | "Soul Trader" |
| 11. | "The Enchanted Tower" |
| 12. | "Sucker for Love (US Version)" |

== Credits and personnel ==
- Niall Murphy: Vocals & keyboards
- Vlad Janicek: Bass Guitar, acoustic guitar, keyboards & drum machine programming
- Damien DeVille: Lead Guitar, drum machine programming & keyboards
- Joby Talbot: Saxophone on "Time Of Legends"
