= Mitsubishi PS platform =

Overview
- Manufacturer: Mitsubishi Motors
- Also called: "Project America"
- Production: March 2003–August 2012

Body and chassis
- Class: Mid-size
- Vehicles: Mitsubishi 380; Mitsubishi Eclipse; Mitsubishi Endeavor; Mitsubishi Galant

The Mitsubishi PS platform, also known as "Project America", is mid-size, front wheel drive platform developed by Mitsubishi Motors North America. It is used for the Endeavor, Galant, and Eclipse. The platform was designed in North America, and vehicles based on it were built at its manufacturing facility in Normal, Illinois.

The Galant-derived 380, built at Mitsubishi Motors Australia's plant in Tonsley Park, Adelaide between 2005 and 2008, also used the PS platform.
