= Mitsubishi 380 =

Australian mid-size car (2005–2008)

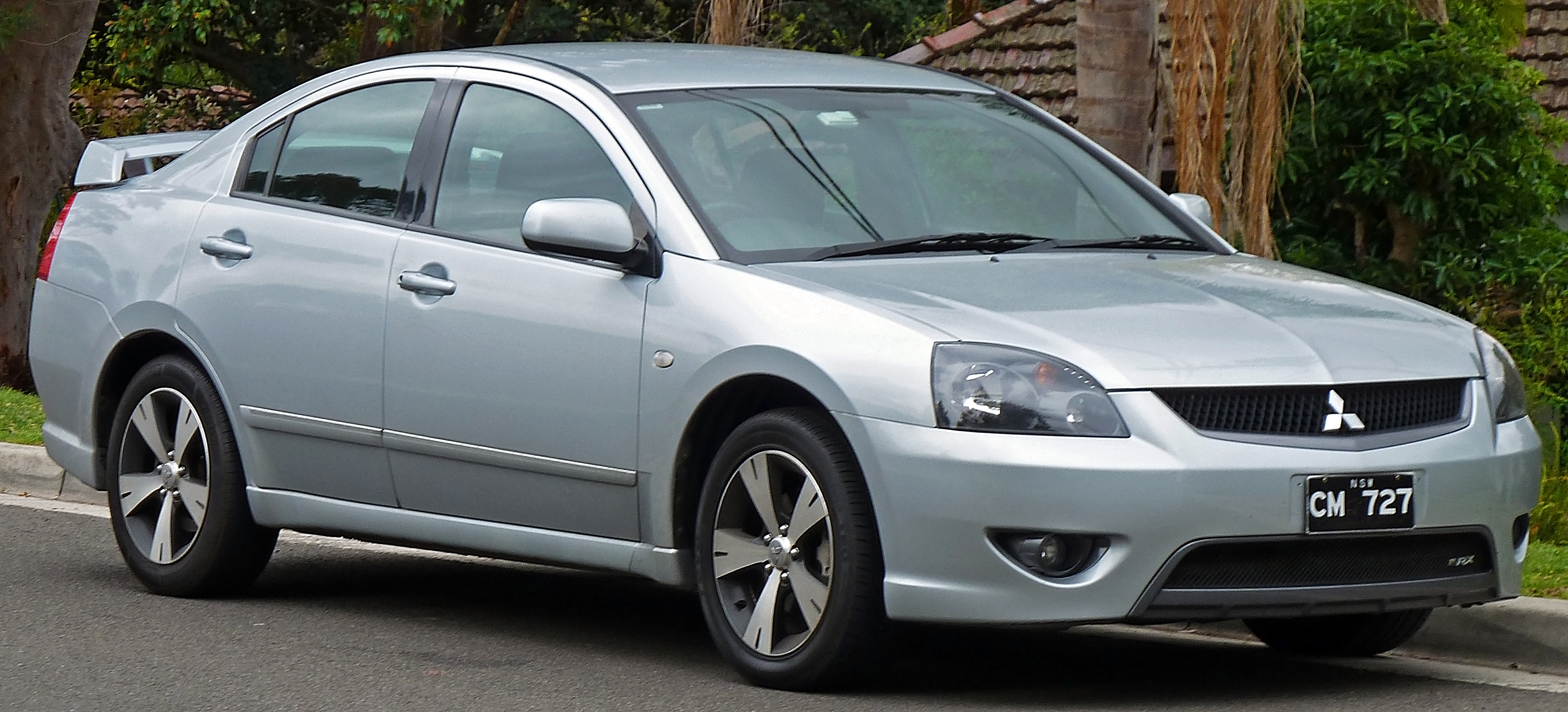

Overview
- Manufacturer: Mitsubishi Motors Australia
- Model code: DB
- Production: October 2005 – March 2008
- Assembly: Australia: Adelaide, South Australia (Clovelly Park)
- Designer: Olivier Boulay

Body and chassis
- Class: Mid-size car
- Body style: 4-door sedan
- Layout: Front-engine, front-wheel-drive
- Platform: Mitsubishi PS platform
- Related: Mitsubishi Galant

Powertrain
- Engine: 3.8 L 6G75 V6
- Transmission: 5-speed manual 5-speed automatic

Dimensions
- Wheelbase: 2,750 mm (108 in)
- Length: 4,837–4,855 mm (190.4–191.1 in)
- Width: 1,840 mm (72 in)
- Height: 1,480 mm (58 in)
- Kerb weight: 1,625–1,670 kg (3,583–3,682 lb)

Chronology
- Predecessor: Mitsubishi Magna/Verada

The Mitsubishi 380 is a mid-size car that was produced between 2005 and 2008 by Mitsubishi Motors Australia. Available only as a sedan, it marked the end of Australian production by the Japanese manufacturer.

The 380, given the model designation DB, was the successor to the Mitsubishi Magna / Verada line of vehicles first introduced in 1985 (1991 for the Verada). The company spent over A$600 million developing and producing the car, being heavily based upon the ninth generation Mitsubishi Galant designed in the United States. The 380 continued Mitsubishi Australia's established habit of producing front-wheel drive sedans for the Australian market, and along with the Toyota Aurion, competed against traditionally well-established local rear-wheel drive Ford Falcon and GM Holden Commodore vehicles.

Even before the car's launch in October 2005, the 380 was stigmatised as the "make or break" model for Mitsubishi Australia. After a slow sales start, the line-up was updated with the Series II in April 2006, with the entry level model attracting a price discount of nearly 20 percent. To generate further interest in the car, a Series III revision came on 29 July 2007 with mainly cosmetic changes. These updates failed to lift sales, and with production still unprofitable, Mitsubishi ceased manufacturing of the 380 in March 2008 after just short of three years in production. A total of 32,044 were produced over the three year production, of which 30,195 were sold in Australia.

== Development ==
The development of the 380 began in 2002, when company executives in Japan gave approval to Mitsubishi Australia to commence work on two closely related vehicles. The first of which was a right-hand drive variant of the ninth generation Mitsubishi Galant, designated the codename PS41. This was to be the replacement for the Magna and Verada. The second, which was planned to be launched in 2007 was a long-wheelbase version known internally as PS41L to be produced in both left- and right-hand drive configurations. However, as Mitsubishi's financial woes worsened, and DaimlerChrysler pulled-out of the DaimlerChrysler-Mitsubishi alliance, PS41L was abandoned in 2004 and the likelihood of PS41 making it into production looked even more doubtful. Company research conducted in mid-2004 revealed that 84 percent of Australians believed that Mitsubishi would cease production in Australia. To reinstate consumer confidence in the brand, before the launch of the 380, a series of television commercials began airing in December 2004. Centralised around Mitsubishi Australia's then CEO Tom Phillips, the advertisements promoted the introduction of an industry-first five-year/130,000-kilometre (81,000 mi) warranty. Mitsubishi reworked a slogan from former Chrysler chairman Lee Iacocca, concluding their commercials with the tagline, "if you can find a better-built, better-backed car anywhere, then buy it".

In total, A$600 million was spent on developing the 380, including $250 million on upgrading the Adelaide production facility to manufacture the vehicle. This included the installation of a new body press, casting the body sides from an individual piece of steel. This has the effect of producing a 0.7 mm (0.03 in) size differentiation from body-to-body, compared to the industry standard of 1–1.5 mm (0.04–0.06 in) in 2005.

The name 380 was chosen as a fresh start to Mitsubishi's sale of its sole Australian-made vehicle, given that the Magna name was now synonymous of slow-selling vehicle that was long overdue for a replacement. Indeed, among the seven names short-listed from a total of 220, Magna was not one of them. According to then CEO, Tom Phillips, the chosen name polled the best and, at the official launch, he stated "'380' conjured up images of high technology, European standards, sophistication and performance with consumers. All of those attributes correlate directly with the positioning of our new car, and when added to the build quality that we are renowned for and a large 3.8-litre engine, '380' was a natural choice for the name of the car".

== Design ==
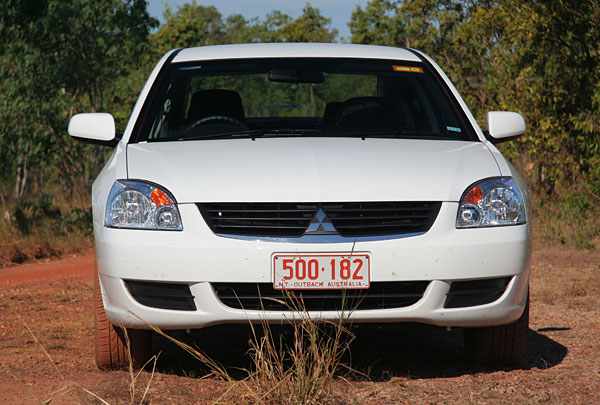
Front-end styling of the DB series (380 base model, pictured), broadly shared with other mid-range and non-sport models

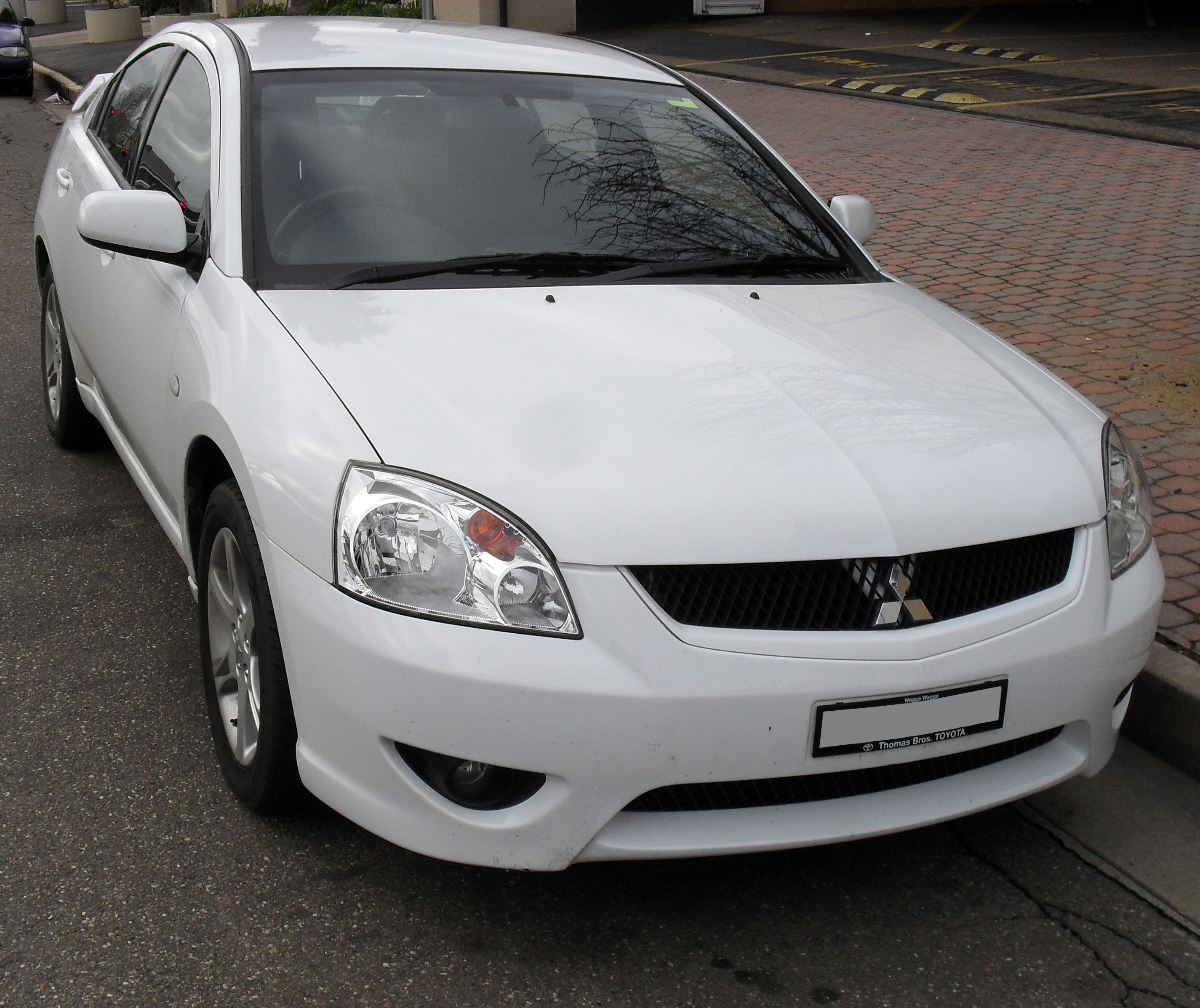
Front-end styling of the DB Series II (380 SX, pictured), broadly shared with the GT and VRX models

From the very beginning of the project, Mitsubishi had always intended that the PS41 would be set apart from the North American Galant in terms of exterior styling. The problem was that PS41 had to share the same basic foundation and the side profile was to remain for the most part unchanged. A revamp of the Clovelly Park facility allowed for the use of more robust bodies. The consequence of this is the tooling required to produce the panels. This gave Mitsubishi the opportunity to make several low key variances to the design. These came in the form of larger front guards, a revised bonnet, new headlamps as well as grilles and bumpers.

The front-end of the PS41 was originally penned by Mitsubishi's design chief, Olivier Boulay. Boulay was also responsible for the 2003 Magna/Verada facelift, but this update fared poorly with buyers. When DaimlerChrysler pulled out of their alliance with Mitsubishi in 2004, it put an end to Boulay-designed Mitsubishis. This allowed for one final chance to progress the exterior design. However, with little more than a year until production, the redesign was shared between Mitsubishi Australia and its parent in Japan. The basic design that was reserved for the base and mid-luxury models was devised by the Japanese studio, whereas the sports oriented design that was conceived locally was reserved for the sports and upper-luxury models within the 380 range.

== Engineering ==
Compared to the Galant, there were changes to 70 percent of the car to create a car more suited to the Australian market. Roads, legislation and consumer preferences were all driving forces behind the changes. The rear of the floorpan had to be overhauled to accommodate a full-sized spare wheel, and superior rear side members were required to improve towing capabilities. Body rigidity was also improved to deal with Australian road conditions. The improved body stiffness resulted in better vehicle dynamics, which were also supported through the use of sophisticated suspension designs, new shock absorbers and stabiliser bars.

The 380 was a sedan only and its sole powerplant was an all-new 3.8-litre V6 engine codenamed 6G75, which was also compatible for LPG fuel. Notably, unlike the practice adopted with its predecessor, the 380 sports models (VRX and GT) did not feature a higher output engine relative to other models in the range. The five-speed manual 380 ES (a five-speed sequential automatic was optional on the ES) was actually the fastest vehicle in the range. The new 175 kW (235 hp) and 343 N⋅m (253 lb⋅ft) engine was capable of propelling the car from 0–100 km/h (0–62 mph) in 7.6 seconds. Because of the choice of gear ratios, the manual and automatic transmission equipped 380s had the same acceleration figures.

== Models ==
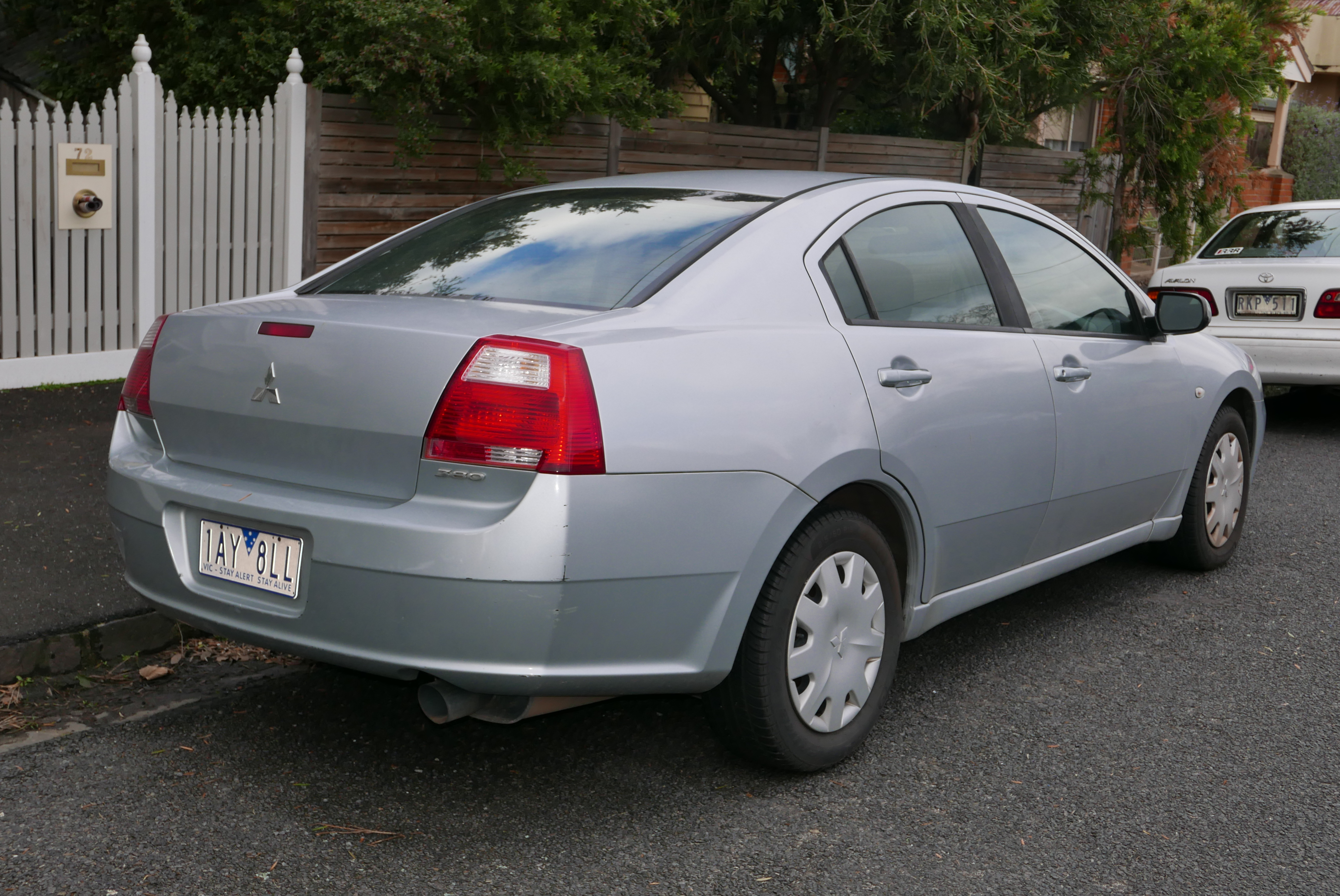
Rear-view of the original base 380

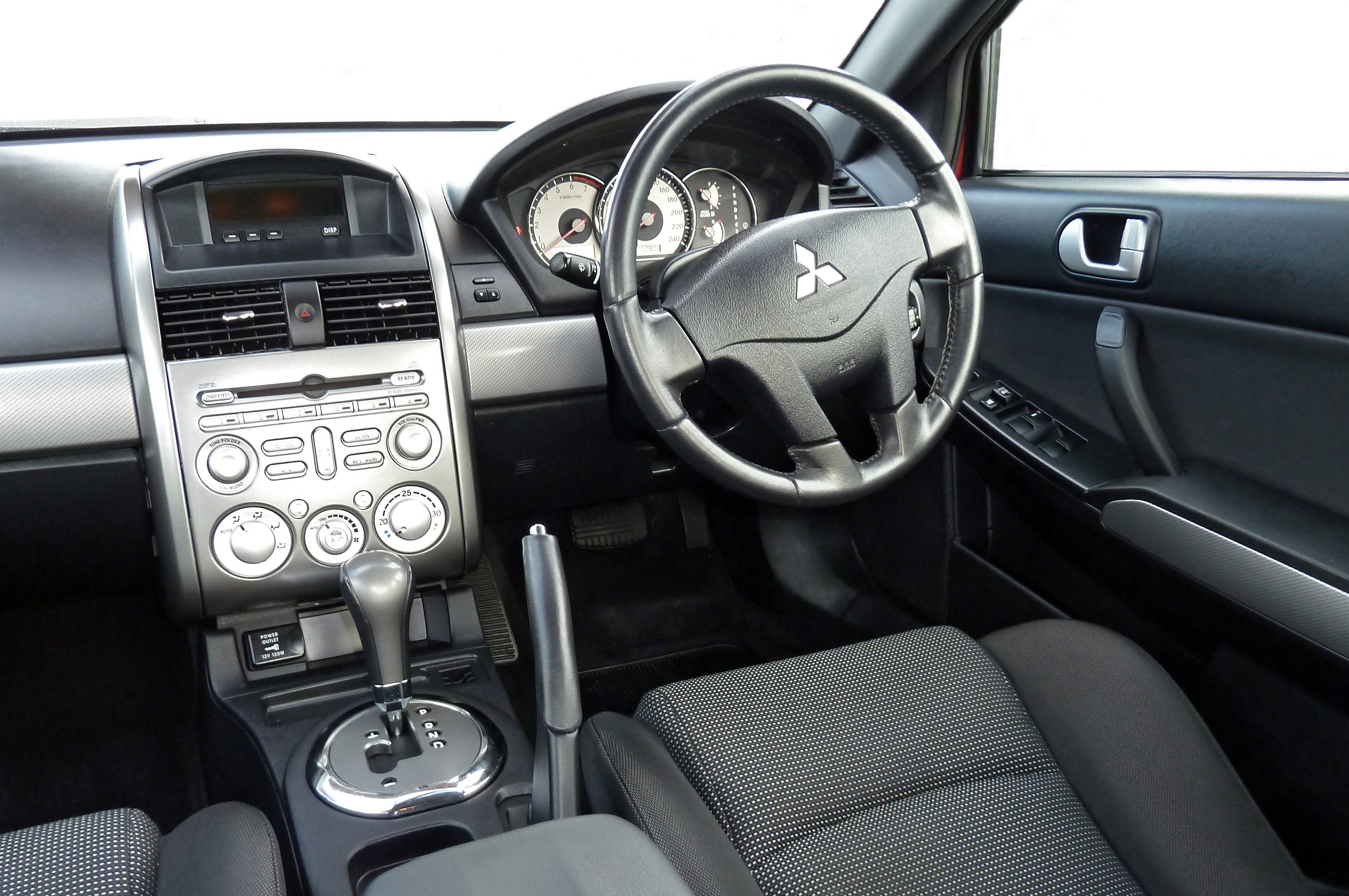
Interior of the DB Series II 380 SX

Between September 2005 and April 2008, the 380 was produced and marketed in three series, as listed below.

=== DB (2005–2006) ===
Dated in every aspect of its design on the day of its launch, the 380 went on sale on 13 October 2005. The range consisted of a 380 base model, the LS, LX, VRX and GT models. Standard equipment included: twin front and side airbags, climate control air-conditioning, cruise control, power windows, trip computer, steering wheel audio controls, and Bosch 8.0 anti-lock braking system. There was also a Limited Edition sold from September 2005 and into 2006.

=== DB Series II (2006–2007) ===
On 28 April 2006, Mitsubishi announced price reductions with the introduction of the Series II upgrade. The entry model, now called the ES, was reduced from A$34,490 to $27,990. An SX model was introduced, priced at $32,990, while the LS model was dropped. Prices on VRX, LX, and GT models were also reduced by amounts ranging from $1,500 to $3,000. Mitsubishi announced that up to 1,500 retail customers who paid the old price would be eligible for a factory rebate of up to $2,000. There were essentially no mechanical or visual changes.

The 380 received the 2005 Australia's Best Cars Large Car award, as well as Insurance Australia Group's rating as the most secure Australian family car, Safest Australian Car Built 2006 for its four-star ANCAP result, Best Fleet Car by Delivery Australia magazine, and Lowest Running Costs in the Australian Motoring Clubs Report. The 3.8-litre engine won an award for engineering excellence from the Society of Automotive Engineers.

=== DB Series III (2007–2008) ===
Mid-July 2007 saw the release of the 380 Series III, with range and price alterations designed to attract further sales and increase private buyer interest. The price of the ES model rose by $1000 but was compensated for by the addition of alloy wheels, fog lights and traction control. A total of four models comprised this range: ES, SX, VRX, and GT.

Unlike the Series II, the new series saw all models received subtle visual and trim changes.

Available with either a five-speed manual or automatic transmission, standard features on the ES included traction control, front and side air bags, automatic climate control air conditioning, power mirrors, power windows, power driver's seat, steering wheel-mounted remote audio controls, and anti-lock brakes with electronic brakeforce distribution (EBD). Also featured in the ES were alloy wheels and sports front bumper treatment with front fog lamps. Next in the range, the auto-only SX adds sports seats with a unique grey trim, leather steering wheel, six-disc CD stereo with multifunction colour LCD, sports rear bumper, 17-inch alloy wheels and sports-tuned suspension.
The VRX featured a more comprehensive sports styling package, adding charcoal accents on the front and rear bumpers, high-profile rear wing, polished and painted 17-inch alloy wheels. Inside the VRX, blue seat fabric was added, as well as "VRX" embroidery on the front seats. Embroidered, silver-stitched leather was available as an option. The VRX was available with a five-speed manual or automatic transmission. The range-topping and automatic-only GT model featured standard leather trim, painted and polished 17-inch alloy wheels, integrated boot spoiler and chrome boot garnish, and side rubbing strips. Mitsubishi offer a no-cost luxury option for the GT, aptly titled the GTL. The GTL sported a more conservative rear light treatment, silver-painted alloy wheels, sunroof and a beige-on-black interior treatment.

At the Series III launch, Mitsubishi released two special edition variants. The Sports Edition, based on the ES, added 17-inch alloy wheels, high-profile rear wing, sports-tuned suspension, black interior trim and sunroof, for no extra cost.

The 380 VRX "Fusion Burst" was based on the VRX and comes in a limited-edition orange hue. Apart from the colour, the Fusion Burst came with sunroof and matching seat fabric for no extra cost.

=== TMR 380 ===
Team Mitsubishi Ralliart (TMR) is an independent motorsport outfit that has also been affiliated with Mitsubishi Motors Australia to market higher performance model variants of the standard Mitsubishi range (in the same mould as FPV, HSV and TRD for Ford, Holden and Toyota Australia, respectively). In 2008, TMR produced the TMR380, a performance-enhanced version of the Series III 380 VRX model on which it was based. It was powered by a supercharged version of the standard 3.8-litre V6 engine, now producing 230 kW (310 hp) and 442 N⋅m (326 lb⋅ft). The car was claimed to take six seconds over the 0–100 km/h (0–62 mph) sprint and was sold exclusively painted in TMR Red with a full body kit, 19-inch chrome alloy wheels and twin chrome exhaust tips. Its retail price was A$56,990, lower than its direct rival, the TRD Aurion. In total, 15 units had already been assembled at TMR's Dandenong facilities with another five on the way from Adelaide for conversion, when Mitsubishi Motors Australia announced the end of local production. All 20 models are individually numbered.

== Safety ==
ANCAP test results* Mitsubishi 380 variant(s) as tested (2005)
Test	Score
Overall	4 /5 stars
Frontal offset	11.40/16
Side impact	15.69/16
Pole	Not Assessed
Seat belt reminders	1/3
Whiplash protection	Not Assessed
Pedestrian protection	Poor
Electronic stability control	Not Assessed

== Production and sales ==
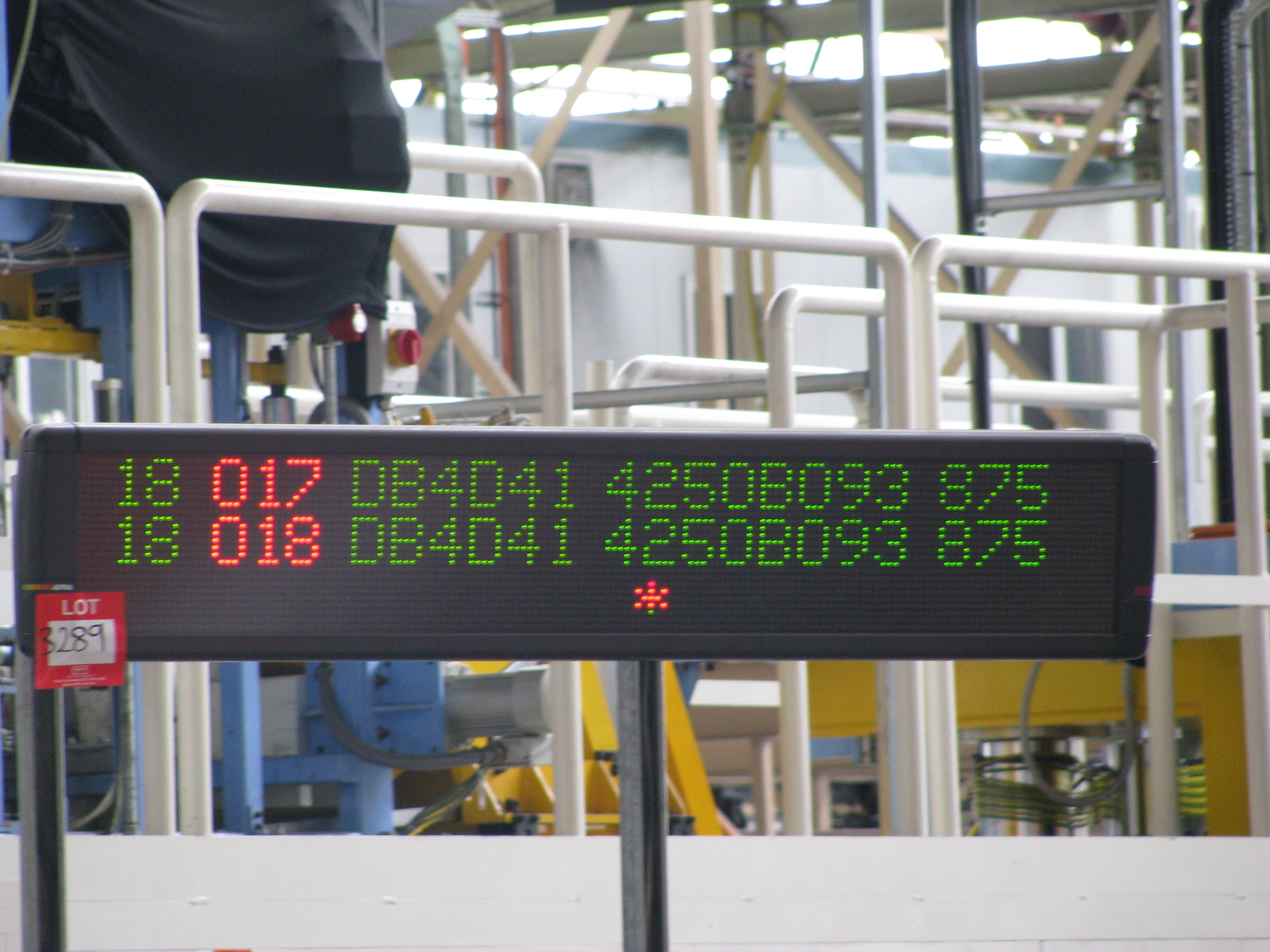
Tyre bay information for the last two 380s built. Vehicle 017 is on display at the National Motor Museum in Birdwood, South Australia. Vehicle 018 was sold at auction with proceeds going to charity.

As a consequence of the first DB series selling in fewer numbers than expected, on 20 January 2006, Mitsubishi Australia announced that voluntary redundancies would be offered to 250 production employees to bring production in line with customer demand. In March 2006, the manufacturing plant closed for three weeks. Apart from launching limited editions (essentially base models with greater equipment levels), Mitsubishi took the drastic steps of applying significant price reductions for both the Series II and Series III.

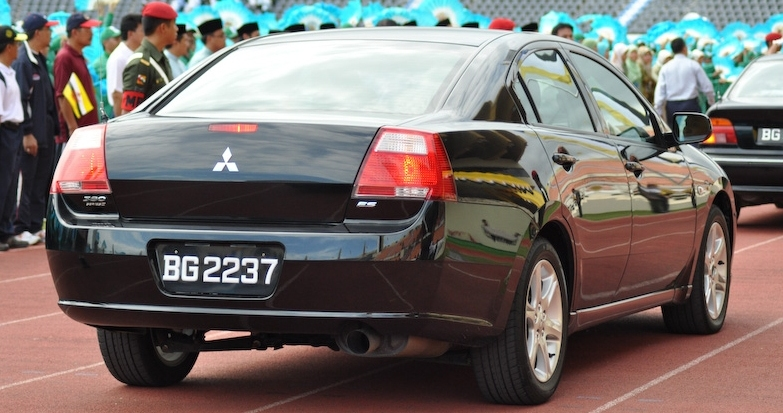
One of several export 380s owned by the government of Brunei.

While the 380 was exported to other countries in small numbers, in the interest of salvaging local production, Mitsubishi Australia had also entered into negotiations with Proton of Malaysia over the possibility for a large export program. Under this program, a rebadged 380 would have replaced the Proton Perdana executive model, however, this deal never succeeded.

On 5 February 2008, Mitsubishi Motors Australia announced that the Clovelly Park plant would be shut down on 31 March, and Mitsubishi would pursue a "full import strategy" for the Australian market due to unviable 380 sales. The last 380 sedan (a silver Platinum Limited Edition, body number 32044) left the production line on 27 March 2008. The car was auctioned in late April 2008, with the $100,000 final price being donated to charities chosen in consultation with the winning bidder, John Hughes Group, a car dealership based in the suburb of Victoria Park, Western Australia. The similar second to last vehicle is exhibited at the Birdwood Motor Museum.

In October 2009, the president of Mitsubishi Motors, Osamu Masuko revealed in hindsight that it "was good that we closed the plant in March 2008 because this was the time the economy was still good and employees could find reemployment."

Production and sales data

Year	Production	Sales (Australia)
2005	11,077	3,548
2006	10,560	12,423
2007	10,230	10,942
2008	177	3,272
2009	-	10
2010	-	1
Total	32,044	30,196

The 380 was also sold in New Zealand.
