= The Rise =

The Rise may refer to:

- The Rise (band), a five-piece American rock band
- The Rise (Futuristic album), 2015
- The Rise (Carl Riseley album), 2008
- The Rise (DJ Sammy album), 2005
- "The Rise", a 2012 song by Charlotte Church from One
- The Rise (film), a 2012 British crime film
- Kid Krrish: The Rise, a 2013 Indian animated film
- Pushpa: The Rise, a 2021 Indian film

== See also ==
- Rise (disambiguation)
