= Rza (disambiguation) =

RZA is the stage name of Robert Diggs (born 1969) an American musician and member of the Wu-Tang Clan.

Rza or RZA may also refer to:

== People ==
- Rasul Rza (1910–1981), Azerbaijani writer
- Rza Tahmasib (1894–1980), Azerbaijani film director and actor
- Rza Osmanov, Azerbaijani athlete; see Azerbaijan at the 2012 Summer Paralympics
- Khalil Rza Uluturk (1932–1994), Azerbaijani poet
- Bulbul (singer) (1897–1961), born Murtuza Rza oglu Mammadov, Azerbaijani opera singer
- RZA Athelston Mayers (born May 13, 2022), son of American rapper A$AP Rocky and Barbadian singer Rihanna

== Other uses ==
- Religious Zionists of America, official body for Modern Orthodox Jews who identify with Religious Zionism
- Republic of South Africa, abbreviated RZA in Dutch

== See also ==
- Riza, a metal cover protecting a religious icon
- Rize (disambiguation)
