= Wonderland (Nosferatu album) =

Studio album by Nosferatu
- Released: 25 March 2011
- Recorded: March 2004 – January 2011
- Genre: Gothic rock
- Length: 46:06
- Label: Dark Fortune

Nosferatu chronology
Lord of the Flies (1998)	Wonderland (2011)

Wonderland is the fifth full-length studio album by English Gothic rock band Nosferatu. It was released in the UK in March 2011 by Dark Fortune Records. It was available on export to Germany, Austria and Switzerland with distribution by Indigo, to USA with distribution by Revelation Records and Italy with distribution by Audioglobe. It is their first album to see the return of vocalist Louis DeWray who rejoined the band in 2003. The album was recorded and mixed at Louis DeWray's Earth Terminal Studios between 2004 and 2011.

== Track listing ==
No.	Title	Length
1.	"Horror Holiday"	5:18
2.	"Wonderland"	6:07
3.	"Jackal"	0:43
4.	"Silver"	5:52
5.	"Bombers"	5:02
6.	"Entwined"	5:14
7.	"Black Hole"	5:29
8.	"Somebody Put Something in My Drink"	3:10
9.	"Spectre"	2:22
10.	"Monument"	6:56
Total length:		46:06

== Credits and personnel ==
- Louis DeWray – Vocals, guitar & keyboards
- Damien DeVille – Lead Guitar
- Nevyn MoonShadow – Bass Guitar
- Belle Star – Drums
- Eddie McEvil – Drums on "Somebody Put Something in My Drink", "Bombers" and "Black Hole"
- Stefan Diablo – Bass guitar on "Somebody Put Something In My Drink"
