= Into a Circle =

- Origin: England
- Genres: New wave
- Years active: 1985–1989
- Labels: Arcadia, Abstract
- Past members: Paul "Bee" Hampshire; Barry Jepson

Into a Circle (also as In Two a Circle and In2a0) were an English new wave duo, formed in April 1985 by Paul "Bee" Hampshire and Barry Jepson, two former members of the band Getting the Fear. Jepson had also previously been the bassist for Southern Death Cult from 1981 to 1983.

== Career ==
Into a Circle formed in 1985 after Getting the Fear ended. The band played their first concert at the Croydon Underground in December 1985, coinciding with the release of their first single, "Rise...". The single, issued on the Arcadia label, reached No. 5 in the UK Indie Singles Chart.

For a March 1986 tour of England and Scotland, the band were joined on several dates by Rose McDowall of Strawberry Switchblade.

In July 1986, Into a Circle signed with Abstract Records and released the single "Inside Out", which reached No. 12 in the chart.

Their third single, "Forever" (1987), co-produced by Larry Steinbeck of Bronski Beat, featured McDowall on backing vocals. and reached No. 8 in the chart. It was followed by their debut studio album, Assassins, in summer 1988. The album reached No. 7 in the UK Indie Albums Chart.

Fourth single "Evergreen" was released in March 1988, and reached No. 5 in the chart.

Into a Circle embarked on their final tour in September 1989, with Annie Anxiety joining the line-up on backing vocals.

The band broke up in October 1989. Into a Circle reformed in July 2021.

== Later projects ==
Hampshire is a member of Thailand-based band Futon, alongside Simon Gilbert (Suede).

Jepson later worked as a concert promoter and currently teaches live sound and tour management at the Brighton Institute of Modern Music.

== Discography ==
- Assassins (1988, Abstract) UK Indie Albums Chart No. 7

=== Singles ===
- "Rise..." (1985, Arcadia) UK Indie Singles Chart No. 5
- "Inside Out" (1986, Abstract) UK Indie No. 12
- "Forever" (1987, Abstract) UK Indie No. 8
- "Evergreen" (1988, Abstract) UK Indie No. 5
