= Asim Ijaz Khwaja =

Pakistani-American economist

- Born: London, United Kingdom

Academic background
- Education: Harvard University; Massachusetts Institute of Technology; Aitchison College

Academic work
- Discipline: Development economics
- Institutions: Harvard University

Asim Ijaz Khwaja (Urdu: عاصم اعجاز خواجہ) is a British-born Pakistani-American economist who serves as the Sumitomo-FASID Professor of international finance and economic development at Harvard Kennedy School, and is the director of the Center for International Development (CID) at Harvard University.

== Early life and education ==
Khwaja was born in London, United Kingdom to Ijaz Ahmed Khawaja, an ophthalmologist, and Zahida Khawaja, a gynecologist, both of who were of Kashmiri descent.. At the age of two, he moved to Kano, Nigeria with his parents, where he lived for eight years. Later, his family moved to Pakistan, where he attended Aitchison College.

Khwaja obtained a bachelor's degree in economics and mathematics with computer science from Massachusetts Institute of Technology in 1995. He received his PhD in economics from Harvard University in 2001.

== Career ==
Khwaja joined Harvard University in June 2001 as an assistant professor.

In October 2005, Khwaja released RISE-PAK, a searchable database for earthquake relief in Pakistan. He was promoted to associate professor at Harvard in June 2006 and professor in January 2010. He has also served as a visiting faculty member at Yale University's Economic Growth Center (2005) and at the Walter A. Haas School of Business at University of California, Berkeley. His areas of interest include development economics, corporate finance, education, political economy, institutions, mechanism design/contract theory and industrial organization. Khwaja is the co-founder of the Center for Economic Research in Pakistan (CERP) and also serves as co-director of Harvard Evidence for Policy Design.

In 2018, Khwaja was appointed by Imran Khan to serve on Pakistan's Economic Advisory Council. Khwaja resigned shortly afterwards, when Atif Mian was forced off the council due to his Ahmadiyya faith.

== Personal life ==
Asim is a citizen of Pakistan, the United Kingdom and the United States. He is married to Sehr Jalal and has three children. He is interested in chaos and complexity theory.

== Selected publications ==
- Khwaja, Asim Ijaz; Mian, Atif (November 23, 2005). "Do lenders favor politically connected firms? Rent provision in an emerging financial market". Quarterly Journal of Economics. 120 (4): 1371–1411. doi:10.1162/003355305775097524 – via princeton-staging.elsevierpure.com.
- Khwaja, Asim Ijaz; Mian, Atif (September 23, 2008). "Tracing the Impact of Bank Liquidity Shocks: Evidence from an Emerging Market". American Economic Review. 98 (4): 1413–1442. doi:10.1257/aer.98.4.1413 – via www.aeaweb.org.
- Iyer, Rajkamal; Khwaja, Asim Ijaz; Luttmer, Erzo F. P.; Shue, Kelly (June 23, 2016). "Screening Peers Softly: Inferring the Quality of Small Borrowers". Management Science. 62 (6): 1554–1577. doi:10.1287/mnsc.2015.2181 – via CrossRef.
- Clingingsmith, David; Khwaja, Asim Ijaz; Kremer, Michael (December 21, 2017). "Estimating the Impact of the Hajj: Religion and Tolerance in Islam's Global Gathering". SocArXiv – via ideas.repec.org.
- Khwaja, Asim Ijaz (August 2009). "Can good projects succeed in bad communities?". Journal of Public Economics. 93 (7–8): 899–916. doi:10.1016/j.jpubeco.2009.02.010.
