= RISE-PAK =

Relief and Information Systems for Earthquakes Pakistan (abbreviated as RISE-PAK) was an information-sharing web portal created by Pakistani-American economist Asim Ijaz Khwaja along with experts from World Bank, Pomona College, National Database and Registration Authority, the World Online, Pakistan's largest Internet service provider which hosted the website, and Lahore School of Management Sciences. It was created after the 2005 earthquake in Kashmir which claimed more than 80,000 lives with around 70,000 injured in Pakistan, India, and Afghanistan.

The website displayed maps of about 4000 villages affected by the quake, with a database of demographic information, disaster information, assistance received, and access routes to the villages in the area. It also provided pre-earthquake information showing village-level demographic and infrastructure data, major road networks, and the distance of every village from the epicentre of the earthquake.

The website won the Stockholm Challenge Award in 2006.

== See also ==
- 2005 Kashmir earthquake
- International response to 2005 Kashmir earthquake
