= Rise (Nosferatu album) =

Studio album by Nosferatu
- Released: June 1993
- Genre: Gothic rock
- Length: 62:22
- Label: Cleopatra Records
- Producers: Damien DeVille, Louis DeWray, Doc. Milton

Nosferatu chronology
Rise (1993)	The Prophecy (1994)

Professional ratings
Review scores
Source	Rating
Allmusic	4/5 stars

Rise is the debut studio album by English gothic rock band Nosferatu. It was released in June 1993 in the United States and Canada, and May 1993 in the United Kingdom and Germany. It is the band's best-selling album with sales of over 14,700.

Due to an error, the album was listed on the UK Singles Chart at No. 188.

== Track listing ==
No.	Title	Length
1.	"The Gathering"	2:15
2.	"Rise"	5:03
3.	"Dark Angel"	5:46
4.	"Her Heaven"	5:43
5.	"Lucy Is Red"	5:20
6.	"Lament"	6:44
7.	"Alone"	5:55
8.	"Vampyres Cry"	3:50
9.	"Crysania"	6:02
10.	"Siren"	5:42
11.	"Away"	3:18
12.	"Close"	6:44

== Personnel ==
- Louis DeWray - vocals
- Vlad Janicek - bass guitar, keyboards & drum machine programming
- Damien DeVille - lead guitar & drum machine programming
