= Glastonbudget =

Annual English music festival

- Genre: Tribute acts New acts
- Locations: Glastonbudget Turnpost Farm, Leicestershire, England
- Years active: 30 April 2005 – present
- Website: www.glastonbudget.org

Glastonbudget is an annual three-day music festival that takes place at Glastonbudget Turnpost Farm in Wymeswold, Leicestershire, England. The festival has been held since 2005.

Initially started as a festival for tribute bands it has expanded in recent years to include a showcase for new acts as well.

Since 2006, the festival has invited special guests to perform. These have included Chas and Dave (2006), the Neville Staples Specials (2007), Bad Manners (2008) and Chesney Hawkes (2009), Ex Simple Minds (2010), Doctor and the Medics (2011) and Showaddywaddy, the Sweet, and the return of Chesney Hawkes in 2012. In 2013, a 1980s revival took place with ABC, Howard Jones, the Christians, and Heaven 17 playing the main stage.

== History ==
Glastonbudget was co-founded by pub owner Nicholas Tanner and a drinking chum: either Christopher Dunn or William Coupe (sources differ.)

According to Pro Sound News Europe and NME magazines, Tanner was managing pubs that regularly booked tribute acts as entertainment. Music teacher Christopher Dunn was head of Soar Valley Music Centre, a music charity. Over drinks, Tanner and Dunn were inspired to create a larger event dedicated to tribute bands. At the first outing, held at Turnpost Farm in Leicestershire, only 686 people attended, and the production team weathered a net loss. By 2010, the audience had grown to 7,000. Event production, catering and sound system management in 2010 were a collaboration between Roland Systems Group, Shuttlesound and OneBigStar.

A different name is given as co-founder in the magazine musicOMH, which reports that Tanner and William Coupe both "deserve credit" as organisers of the festival. No other detail is provided.

=== 2005 ===
The first Glastonbudget festival was held in May 2005 and occurred for two days over a weekend. The acts included the Red Hot Chili Peppers tribute band otherwise known as the Ded Hot Chili Peppers, Oasis tribute band Oasish and Coldplay tribute band Coolplay. The attendance for the event was a mere 680 people.

=== 2006 ===
Glastonbudget began to grow as more acts began to play at the festival. Some of these new acts included Who Tribute, Who's Who; a Guns N' Roses tribute band Guns 2 Roses, a Queen tribute act called Mercury and a Green Day tribute, Green Days. Moreover, Glastonbudget had also become a host to a small beer festival along with showcasing local new original talents. The new acts were given their own stage to perform on, while the tribute acts remained on the main tribute stage.

=== 2007 ===
In 2007 Glastonbudget hosted its first three-day event during the month of May which saw many new acts and returning tribute bands. Many of the acts from the previous years returned including Guns 2 Roses, Oasish and Mercury while some of new tribute acts that debuted were Antarctic Monkeys and Fake That.

=== 2008 ===
Again, the event was hosted over three days in May and as the festivals popularity increased the number of stages increased to three the Main Stage, the New Acts Stage and the New Acts Marquee. Hosted at the event this year was the Real Ale Festival and new tribute acts included Maybe Winehouse, the Fillers and the Kaiser Thief's.

=== 2009 ===
By 2009 Glastonbudget included a total of five stages and over the three day event the Main Stage, the Campsite Stage, the new Acts Stage, the Charnie Arny and the Bus Stage. New tribute acts included the Kins of Leon and Blurb. The festival also featured "The Scrap Metal Tour" composed of Ireland Maiden, Metallitia, Rubber Plants, ThunderStruck and User Illusion playing until midnight on the Saturday. Also in 2009 the festival featured Chesney Hawkes who had a number one single in the UK and a top ten hit in the US with the One and Only. Who's Who followed Chesney Hawkes

=== 2010 ===
Glastonbudget featured six stages: the Main Stage, the Showcase, the Charnie Arny, the Acoustic Tent, the Campsite Marquee and the BBC Radio Leicester Stage. New tribute act include Blings of Leon, Coldplace and Four Fighters. Returning acts featured Blurb, Mercury and Oasish. A Real Ale tasting was also held at the festival.

=== 2011 ===
In 2011 the festival featured five stages: the Main Stage, the Charney Arny, the Saddle Span, the Acoustic Stage and the Showcase Bigtop. The new tribute acts included Beach Boys Smile and Hot Red Chilli Peppers. The returning tribute acts included Mercury, the Fillers, Guns 2 Roses and Four Fighters. The Real Ale festival was also held. A special guest appearance by Doctor and the Medics was also featured.

=== 2012 ===
The 2012 festival featured six stages: the Main Stage, the Big top, the Saddle Span, the Jubilee, the Charnie Arnie and the Acoustic stage. Acts new to the Main Stage this year included the Humberstones, Absolute Bowie, Bad Boys, Vogue UK, Michael Jackson UK and Kazabian. Also performing on the Main Stage was local Leicestershire 70s band Showaddywaddy. Some of the returning acts included Who’s Who, One Step Behind and T-rextasy.

=== 2013 ===
Glastonbudget featured five stages in 2013, the Main Stage, the Big Top, the Ic0n, the Charnie Arnie and the Acoustic Stage. Some of the new Main Stage acts were the FuFu Sailors, Come Undone and Bass Alien. The returning acts included Green Date, ABBA Revival, MJUK, the Fillers and the Four Fighters. The Festival featured several 1980s artists including the Christians, Heaven 17, Howard Jones and ABC.

=== 2014 ===
2014 featured five stages the Main Stage, the Big Top, Ic0n, LoCo and the Acoustic Stage. The Main Stage’s newest acts were the Bootleg Beetles, UK X-Factor finalist, Kitty Brucknell, Talon Eagles and Speak and Spell. Who's Who headlined on the Friday night; while Guns 2 Roses, the Fillers, Kins of Leon and others made a return to the Main Stage while other tribute acts such as the Four Fighters, Metallica Reloaded and Fell Out Boy played in the Big Top.

=== 2015 ===
In May 2015, Kazabian headlined on Friday night, Totally Tina on Saturday night, and Antarctic Monkeys on Sunday. A total of 30 tribute acts and 130 local acts performed.

=== 2016 ===
In May 2016, Absolute Bowie headlined on Friday night, Gordon Davis as Elvis on Saturday night, and Mercury on Sunday.

=== 2017 ===
Glastonbudget ran from 26 to 28 May 2017. Bands included Traps, Whiskey Rebellion, Anoa, Kazabian, Skam, Jimmy Amnesia, the Dedbeats, Strategy, Elysian, Thunder Hammer, the Moderators, Chimp On A Bike, Flip Like Wilson, Damage Protocol, Kynch, and others. Traps was awarded Glastonbudget Band of the Year.

=== 2018 ===
The festival took place 25–27 May 2018, including a tribute to Dolly Parton and The Cureheads who played through a thunderstorm and whose singer got electrocuted.

=== 2022 ===
The 2020 and 2021 festivals were cancelled due to the pandemic, the next festival is planned for 2–4 June 2022, and should feature the Bootleg Beatles and Mercury.

=== 2023 ===
The festival returned for a 3 day event spread over 4 stages.

=== 2024 ===
The festival opened a day earlier on Thursday and had warm-up events. The event still took place over 3 days, but reduced in size it only had 2 stages, the main stage and the big top. Flash, a Queen tribute, Absolute Bowie and Young Elton headlined the 3 days.

== Controversy ==
In late 2008 a dispute arose between the festival organisers which eventually ended with the trademark and glastonbudget.co.uk domain being transferred to Mockstar, a limited company controlled by Kirsty Tanner. During the dispute, two websites existed with contradictory claims to who was running the festival.

In July 2010, co-founder Dunn was suspended from his managing role at Soar Valley Music Centre, because of concerns he was too intimate with several 15-year-old female students. In May 2014, he was convicted of seven sex offences against three different 15-year-old girls, which put him on the lifetime list of registered sex offenders. Denying the charges, he was sentenced to eight years in prison, which was reduced on appeal in 2015 to five years.

In April 2018, co-founder Tanner pleaded guilty to five counts of possessing indecent images of female children on his laptop computer, putting him for ten years on the list of registered sex offenders. Tanner was sentenced to nine months, the sentence suspended for two years. He was required to perform ten days of rehabilitation service, and 200 hours of unpaid work.
