= Risa (given name) =

- Gender: Female

Origin
- Origin: Japanese
- Meaning: It can have many different meanings depending on the kanji used Originally from English name “Lisa”
- Region of origin: Japan

Risa (りさ, リサ) is a female given name, which exists most commonly in Japanese, but may be found elsewhere.

== Written forms ==
Risa can be written using different kanji characters and can mean:

- 梨彩, "pear, coloring"
- 梨沙, "pear, sand"
- 梨紗, "pear, silk gauze"
- 里沙, "village, sand"
- 里紗, "village, silk gauze"
- 理沙, "reason, sand"
- 理佐, "reason, aid"
- 理紗, "reason, silk gauze"

The name can also be written in hiragana or katakana.

== People ==
- Risa Goto (理沙; born 1983), Japanese actress and singer
- Risa Hayamizu (リサ; born 1975), Japanese voice actress
- Risa Hayashida (理沙; born 1989), Japanese announcer
- Risa Hirako (理沙; born 1971), Japanese fashion model
- Risa Honda (理沙; born 1971), Japanese singer
- Risa Hontiveros (born 1966), Filipino socialist activist, politician, and journalist
- Risa Horowitz (born 1970), Canadian visual and media artist
- Risa Ishii (里沙; born 1990), Japanese volleyball player
- Risa Itō (理佐; born 1969), Japanese manga artist
- Risa Junna (りさ; born 1971), Japanese actress
- Risa Kawano, Japanese drummer
- Risa Kudō (里紗; born 1983), Japanese model and actress
- Risa L. Goluboff, American lawyer and legal historian
- Risa Lavizzo-Mourey (born 1954), American doctor
- Risa Miyashita (梨沙; born 1984), Japanese javelin thrower
- Risa Mizuno (理紗; born 1978), Japanese voice actress
- Risa Nakamura (里砂; born 1989), Japanese model, actress, television personality, and businessperson
- Risa Niigaki (里沙; born 1988), Japanese singer and actress
- Risa Nishioka (里紗; born 1997), Japanese women's basketball player
- Risa Shimizu (理沙; born 1988), Japanese actress and voice actress
- Risa Oribe (里沙; born 1987), Japanese singer
- Risa Ohki (理紗; born 1960), Japanese vocalist
- Risa Ozaki (里紗; born 1994), Japanese tennis player
- Risa Sato (理沙; born 1994), Filipino-Japanese volleyball player
- Risa Sera (理紗; born 1991), Japanese professional wrestler and actress
- Risa Shigetomo (梨佐; born 1987), Japanese long-distance runner
- Risa Shimamoto (里沙; born 1987), Japanese gravure idol
- Risa Shimizu (actress) (理沙; born 1988), Japanese actress and voice actress
- Risa Shimizu (footballer) (梨紗; born 1996), Japanese football player
- Risa Shinnabe (理沙; born 1990), Japanese volleyball player
- Risa Shiragaki (里紗; born 1991), Japanese volleyball player
- Risa Shōji (理紗; born 1996), Japanese figure skater
- Risa Sugimoto (梨沙; born 1994), Japanese squash player
- Risa Tachibana (理佐; born 1971), Japanese idol
- Risa Takenaka (理沙; born 1990), Japanese long-distance runner
- Risa Taneda (梨沙; born 1988), Japanese voice actress
- Risa Tsubaki (理沙; born 1979), Japanese voice actress
- Risa Watanabe (理佐; born 1998), Japanese idol and model
- Risa Wataya (りさ; born 1984), Japanese novelist
- Risa Wechsler, American physicist
- Risa Yoshiki (りさ; born 1987), Japanese gravure idol and singer

== Fictional characters ==
- Risa Harada (梨紗), character from the anime and manga series, D.N.Angel
- Risa Koizumi, character from the anime and manga series, Lovely Complex
- Risa Kanzaki, character from the anime and manga series, Neighborhood Story and Paradise Kiss
- Risa Shindo, a character from the film Battle Royale II: Requiem
- Risa Ward, character from the young adult science fiction novel Unwind (novel) by Neal Shusterman
- Risa Onda, a character in the horror video game, Forbidden Siren
- Risa, a character from the animated film, Pokémon the Movie: The Power of Us

== See also ==
- Lisa
