= Mitsubishi Motors Australia =

Australian automotive manufacturer

Mitsubishi Motors Australia Limited
- Type: Subsidiary
- Industry: Automobile manufacturing (till 2008), import, distribution, and marketing
- Founded: 1 October 1980; 46 years ago
- Headquarters: Adelaide, South Australia
- Key people: Shaun Westcott (CEO)
- Products: Motor vehicles
- Parent: Mitsubishi Motors Corporation
- Website: mitsubishi-motors.com.au

Mitsubishi Motors Australia Limited (MMAL) is a fully owned subsidiary of Mitsubishi Motors Corporation of Japan, headquartered in Adelaide, South Australia. The company was established in 1980 and began vehicle manufacturing in that year, having taken over the facilities of Chrysler Australia. Australian production ceased in 2008 and since that time the company has been exclusively a vehicle importer.

== History ==
=== Chrysler ===
Construction of the vehicle assembly plant at Tonsley Park was commenced by the then owners, Chrysler Australia, in 1963, and the assembly plant was opened in October 1964.

=== Mitsubishi Motors Australia – established 1 October 1980 ===
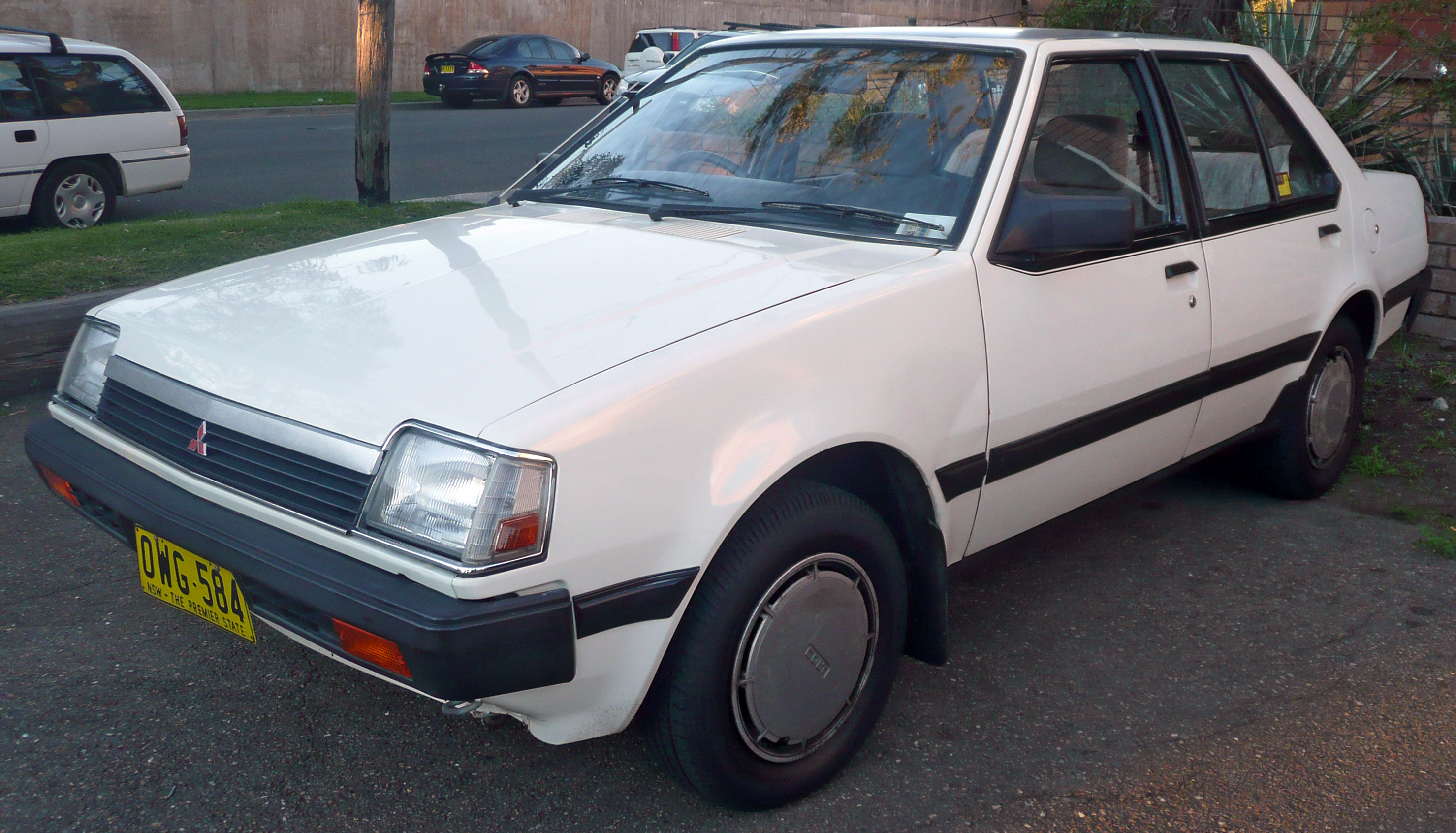
The Colt subcompact car was produced from 1982 until 1990

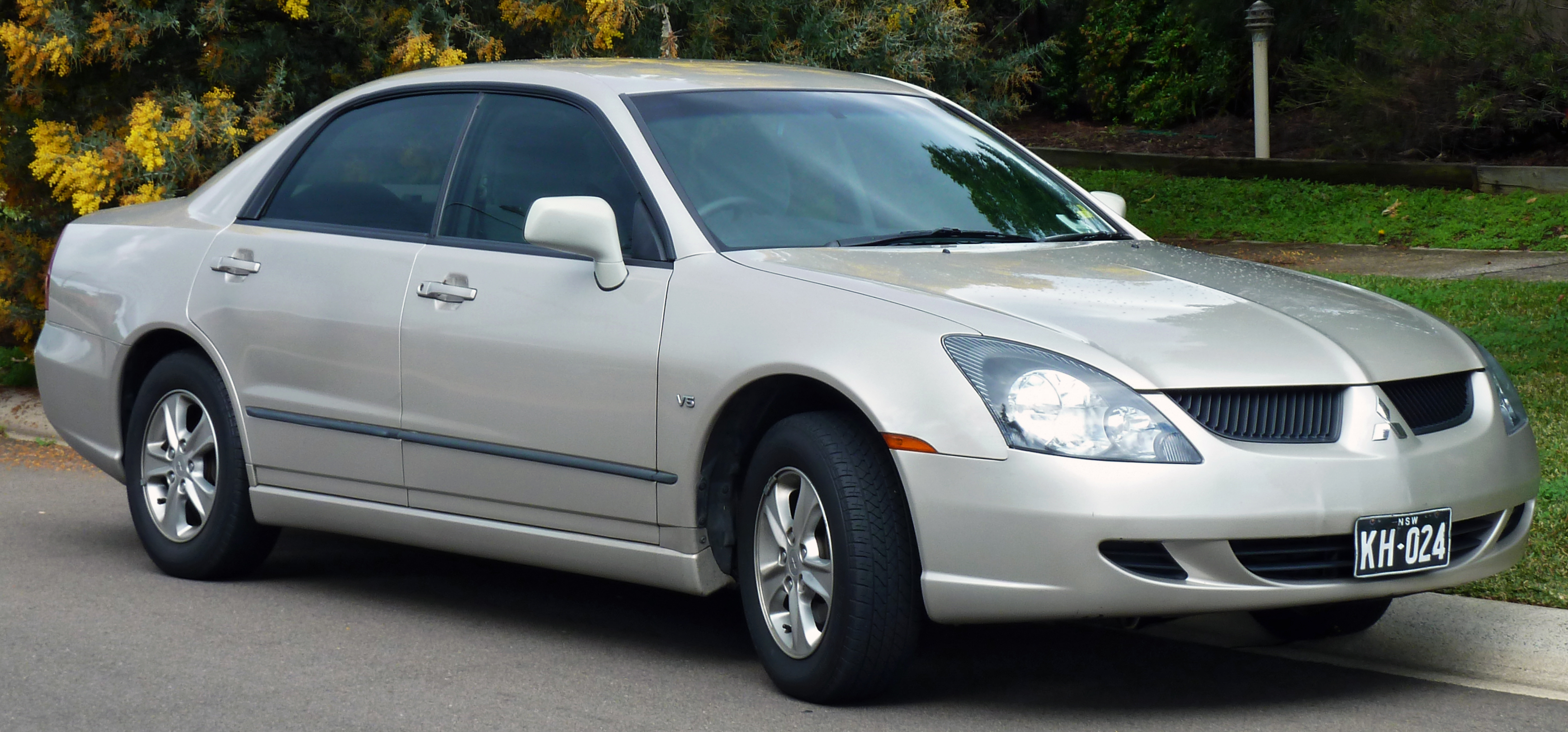
The Magna mid-size car was produced from 1985 until 2005

After the acquisition by parent company Chrysler of a 15 percent interest in Mitsubishi Motors Corporation in 1971, Chrysler Australia began building Mitsubishi-designed Chrysler-branded vehicles, namely the Chrysler Valiant Galant (later Chrysler Galant), based on the 1972–1977 Mitsubishi Galant and the Chrysler Sigma, a variant of the 1977–1985 Mitsubishi Galant. In 1979, Mitsubishi Motors Corporation and Mitsubishi Corporation each acquired a one sixth equity in Chrysler Australia. The collective price paid for the two-sixths equity was A$27 million.

On 30 April 1980, the two Japanese companies assumed 98.9 percent control by paying a further $52 million to acquire Chrysler's remaining 65 percent share. The remaining 1.1 percent was held by 690 local investors. The company name was changed to Mitsubishi Motors Australia Limited on 1 October 1980. Production of the popular Sigma range of vehicles continued under the Mitsubishi name until 1987 with its eventual replacement, the Magna, having been released in 1985. Colt production, which had commenced in 1982, ended in 1990, with no locally manufactured replacement.

The Magna, like its forebear the Sigma, was based on the Japanese Galant. Input from MMAL resulted in a wider car than the Japanese donor model to suit the Australian market and to compete with the popular Ford Falcon and Holden Commodore. A station wagon variant was added to the model lineup in 1987. The Magna received several model refreshes during the 1990s including a luxury variant named Verada. However, by the early 2000s, it was clear that the Magna / Verada line, now in its third iteration had aged considerably. A facelift to the Magna / Verada line in 2003 failed to lift sales. After lobbying from Mitusubishi Motors Australia Limited (MMAL) approval for construction of a new vehicle was granted by Mitsubishi Motors Corporation. Funding was provided to reengineer the Tonsley Park plant with the result that a new vehicle, the Mitsubishi 380, was delivered to the market in late 2005.

In 2003 MMAL gained approval from MMC to create Mitsubishi Research and Development Australia (MRDAus) with a budget of $30 million. MRDAus was to be the fourth global Mitsubishi Research and Development Centre. MMAL's proving ground at Tailem Bend was to be upgraded including the addition of a high speed oval and numerous other proving ground facilities and the Testing and Proving group's laboratories at MMAL headquarters in Tonsley Park was also to be upgraded. MRDAus was originally tasked with completing Mitsubishi 380 Testing and Proving prior to the start of volume production. MRDAus also negotiated substantial job share for the testing and proving of the PS41L, the codename for a stretched 380 for the US market. Unfortunately with the financial woes facing MMC globally and the cancelling of the PS41L program MRDAus was unable to reach its full potential. In late 2004 after expanding to 90 personnel the MRDAus expansion was halted before the 380 was even launched. A security fence around most of the expanded Tailem Bend site was almost completed and the earthworks for the high speed oval had begun when work was halted in 2004.

=== Sales challenges ===
Mitsubishi Motors Corporation's financial and legal issues weighed hard on MMAL, with public perception of the viability of the company reaching an all-time low in 2004. Company research conducted in mid-2004 revealed that roughly four out of every five believed that Mitsubishi would cease production in Australia.

The withdrawal of DaimlerChrysler from its involvement with Mitsubishi Motors Corporation in 2004, along with the revitalisation plan that called for the closure of the Lonsdale engine plant, did not help the public's perception of MMAL as a viable company.

MMAL ended 2004 with a stockpile of approximately 4,000 unsold Magnas and Veradas. To restore consumer confidence in the brand and to clear the model backlog, a series of television advertisements began airing in December 2004. Centred on Mitsubishi Australia's then Chief executive officer, Tom Phillips, the advertisements promoted the introduction of an industry-first five-year/130,000 kilometre warranty. Mitsubishi reworked a slogan from former Chrysler chairman Lee Iacocca, concluding their commercials with the tagline, "If you can find a better-built, better-backed car anywhere, then buy it". The campaign successfully boosted sales and allowed the backlog to be cleared.

The Mitsubishi 380, the successor vehicle to the Magna, raised hopes for the future of MMAL when launched. Hopes stemmed from the sales success that the Magna experienced when it was launched and the fact that the Australian automobile market was growing at the time. However, the 380 sold poorly from its introduction and failed to meet expected sales targets. This resulted in a reduction in daily production volume from 180 to 50 vehicles per day, along with further reductions in the workforce.

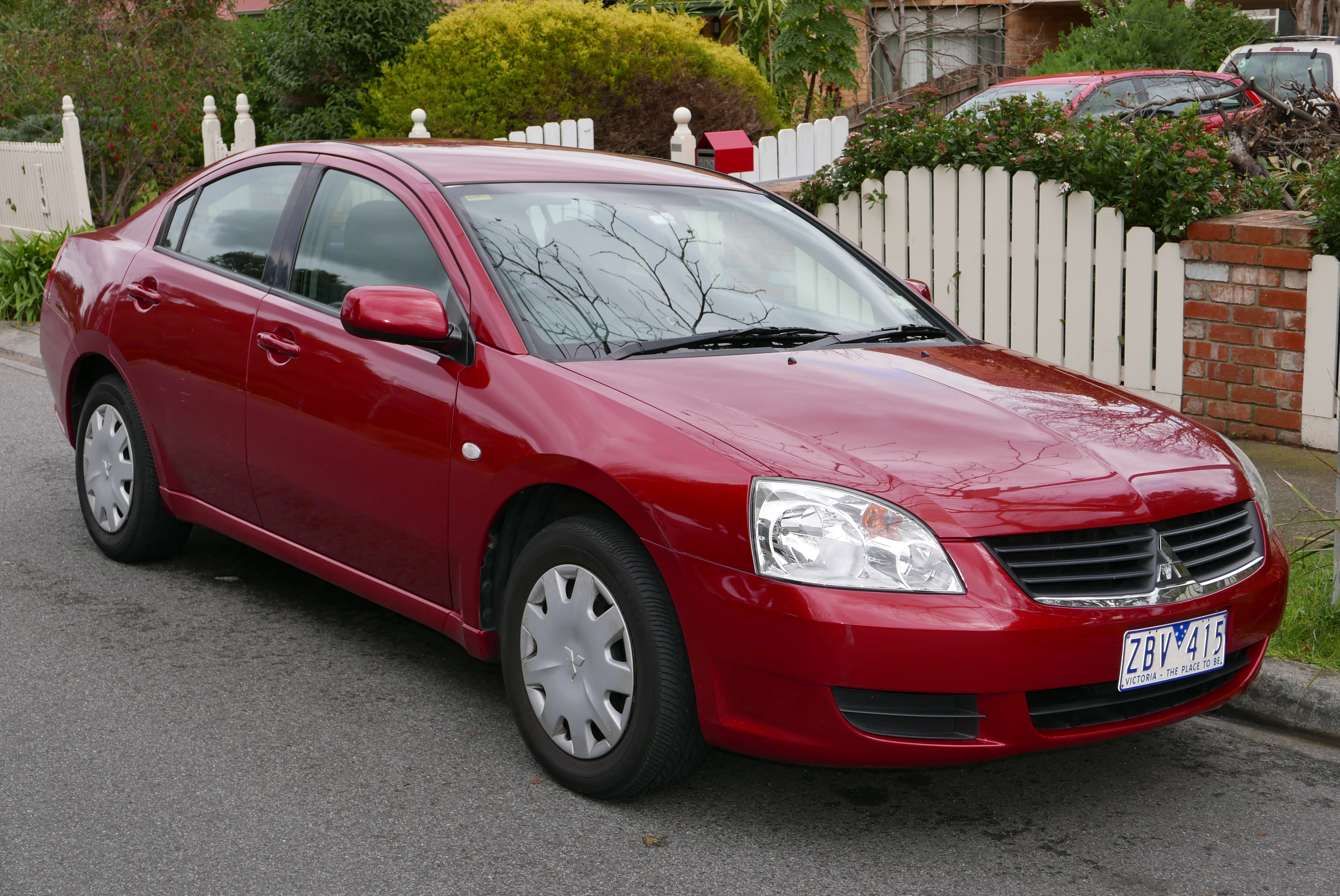
The "make or break" Mitsubishi 380 began production in 2005, lasting less than three years on the market.

Sales of other Mitsubishi Motors Corporation vehicles began to show improvement in Asian and European markets as new vehicles were introduced during 2006. These vehicles were also introduced into the Australian market, boosting MMAL's Australian sales into the segments that these vehicles occupied, though this did nothing to help their sales of locally manufactured product.

=== Cessation of local production and corporate restructure ===
On 5 February 2008, it was announced that MMAL would cease production of the 380 at the Tonsley Park plant, effective at the end of March 2008. The two-page statement released announced they would pursue a "full import strategy" for the Australian market due to unviable 380 sales. The last Mitsubishi 380 sedan left the production line on 27 March 2008. Coinciding with the last vehicles to leave the line was the redundancy of about 500 workers, with another 430 staying for another 12 months. Those remaining decommissioned the plant and produced a stockpile of spare parts destined to last ten years.

By late 2009, MMAL had removed the last piece of manufacturing equipment from the Tonsley Park assembly plant. Ownership of the plant was handed over to the Government of South Australia on 16 December 2009.

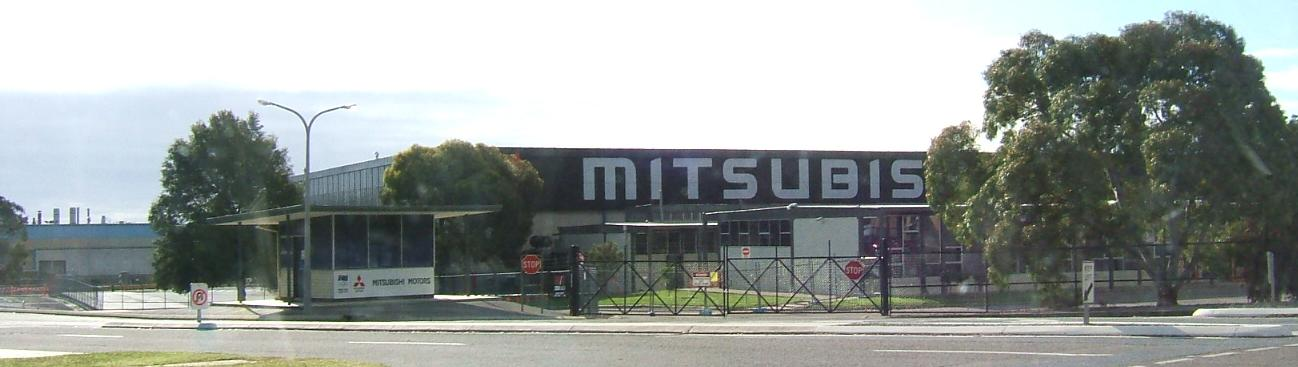
The disused Mitsubishi plant in Adelaide

At the same time, MMAL began a restructure of the remaining divisions of the company. This restructure concluded in mid-2009 and saw staff numbers reduced to around 200 through redundancy and outsourcing.

The majority of the remaining staff are involved with sales and marketing activities, though MMAL retains some product engineering capability to perform any design changes that may be required to fit Mitsubishi Motors Corporation's global products into the Australian market.

==== Redevelopment of plant sites ====
The 61-hectare Tonsley site is being redeveloped for retail, TAFE facilities, hi-tech manufacturing, with future residential plans.

The Lonsdale engine manufacturing plant was transformed into the Onkaparinga Recycling plant in 2010.

== Vehicle lineup ==
Since the end of local 380 production, the entire vehicle range that MMAL sells is imported from Japan with the ASX, Eclipse Cross, and Outlander, while also imported from Thailand and with the Pajero and Triton, while also imported from Taiwan with the ASX VR-e.

Current passenger cars

- Mitsubishi ASX
- Mitsubishi ASX VR-e
- Mitsubishi Eclipse Cross
- Outlander/Outlander PHEV
- Mitsubishi Pajero

Current commercial vehicles

- Mitsubishi Triton

Former passenger cars

- Mitsubishi 380
- Mitsubishi Colt
- Mitsubishi Express
- Mitsubishi Galant
- Mitsubishi Lancer
- Mitsubishi Magna
- Mitsubishi Mirage
- Mitsubishi Pajero Sport
- Mitsubishi Verada

== Production and sales, 1991–2007 ==
Year	Production	Sales
1991	29,074	n/a
1992	36,714	n/a
1993	52,521	n/a
1994	47,859	n/a
1995	39,728	n/a
1996	43,235	n/a
1997	58,290	n/a
1998	47,296	n/a
1999	34,883	n/a
2000	38,566	70,599
2001	43,801	65,512
2002	46,191	65,054
2003	31,470	66,979
2004	17,245	56,260
2005	18,657	55,307
2006	10,560	57,288
2007	10,230	66,410

(Sources: Fact & Figures 2000, Fact & Figures 2005, Fact & Figures 2008, Mitsubishi Motors website)
