= Rise (Into a Circle song) =

"Rise..."
- Front cover of the single "Rise"

Single by In Two A Circle
- A-side: "Rise..."
- B-side: "And in Flames", "Gabriel"
- Released: 1985
- Genre: New wave
- Label: Arcadia Records

Into a Circle singles chronology
"Rise..." (1985)	"Inside Out" (1986)

Rear cover art

"Rise..." is the 1985 debut single by English new wave duo Into a Circle, credited here as 'In Two a Circle'.

== Track listing ==
12" (1985, Arcadia, ARC001)

- "Rise..."
- "And in Flames"
- "Gabriel"

== Sleeve notes ==
"Nevermore a piece in our memory. Will to go on, will crucify, will caress... will circle you in two."
