= Rise Again =

Rise Again may refer to:

- "Rise Again" (DJ Sammy song), 2004
- "Rise Again" (The Rankin Family song), 1993
- "Rise Again", a song by Hush from The Open Book, 2009
- "Rise Again", a song by Dallas Holm, 1977
- Rise Again (Alabama Thunderpussy album), 1998
- Rise Again (The Dreaming album), 2015, album by American band The Dreaming
- Rise Again (The Purple Helmets album), 1989
- Rise Again, an EP by Crush 40, 2012
- Rise Again (songbook), 2016 sequel to Rise Up Singing
