= RISE: A Pop History of Asian America from the Nineties to Now =

RISE: A Pop History of Asian America from the Nineties to Now is a 2022 book written by Jeff Yang, Philip Wang, and Phil Yu about Asian-American culture.

== Content ==
The book contains is divided into three sections, for the 1990s, 2000s, and the 2010s. Each section contains articles and timelines created by the three authors, and interviews from Asian-Americans who were famous during each decade.

== See also ==
- A Magazine
- Angry Asian Man
