= Hot Rize (disambiguation) =

Hot Rize is a bluegrass band formed in 1978 in Colorado, United States.

Hot Rize may also refer to:

- Hot Rize (album), a 1979 album by Hot Rize
- Martha White, a brand of flour known for "Hot-Rize" leavening
