= Mitsubishi Endeavor =

Mid-size crossover SUV by Mitsubishi (2004–2011)

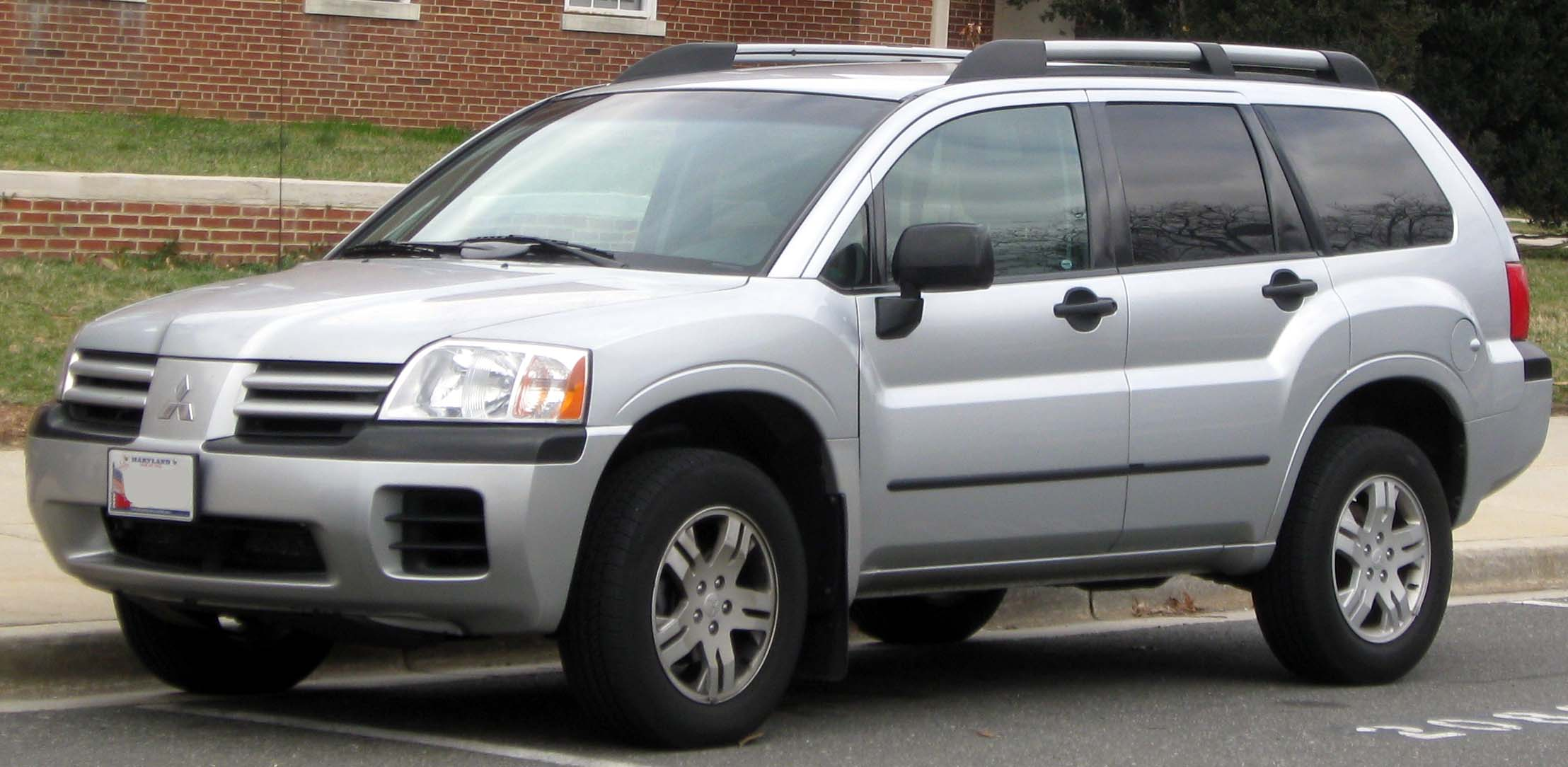

Overview
- Manufacturer: Mitsubishi Motors
- Production: 2003–2011
- Model years: 2004–2011
- Assembly: United States: Normal, Illinois (MMNA)
- Designer: Dave O'Connell (2000)

Body and chassis
- Class: Mid-size crossover SUV
- Body style: 5-door SUV
- Layout: Front-engine, front-wheel-drive or four-wheel-drive
- Platform: Mitsubishi PS platform
- Chassis: Unibody
- Related: Mitsubishi Eclipse; Mitsubishi Galant

Powertrain
- Engine: 3.8 L 6G75 SOHC 24v V6
- Transmission: 4-speed automatic

Dimensions
- Wheelbase: 108.3 in (2,751 mm)
- Length: 190.2–190.8 in (4,831–4,846 mm)
- Width: 73.6 in (1,869 mm)
- Height: 69.6–70.2 in (1,768–1,783 mm)
- Curb weight: 3,869–4,167 lb (1,755–1,890 kg)

Chronology
- Predecessor: Mitsubishi Montero Sport
- Successor: Mitsubishi Outlander; Mitsubishi Montero Sport (2011)

The Mitsubishi Endeavor is a mid-size crossover SUV that was built by Mitsubishi Motors at their manufacturing facility in Normal, Illinois from 2003 until 2011. Based on the PS platform, it was the first vehicle built under Mitsubishi's "Project America", a program aimed at introducing vehicles for North America without having to compromise for, or accommodate, global markets.

== Design ==
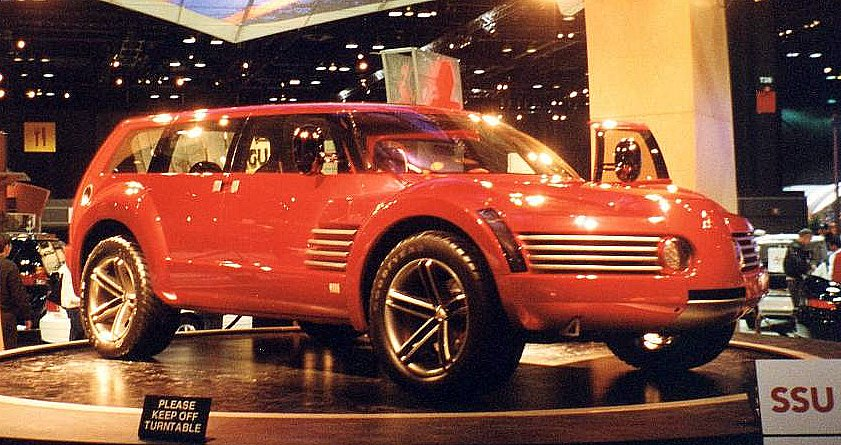
1999 Mitsubishi SSU Concept

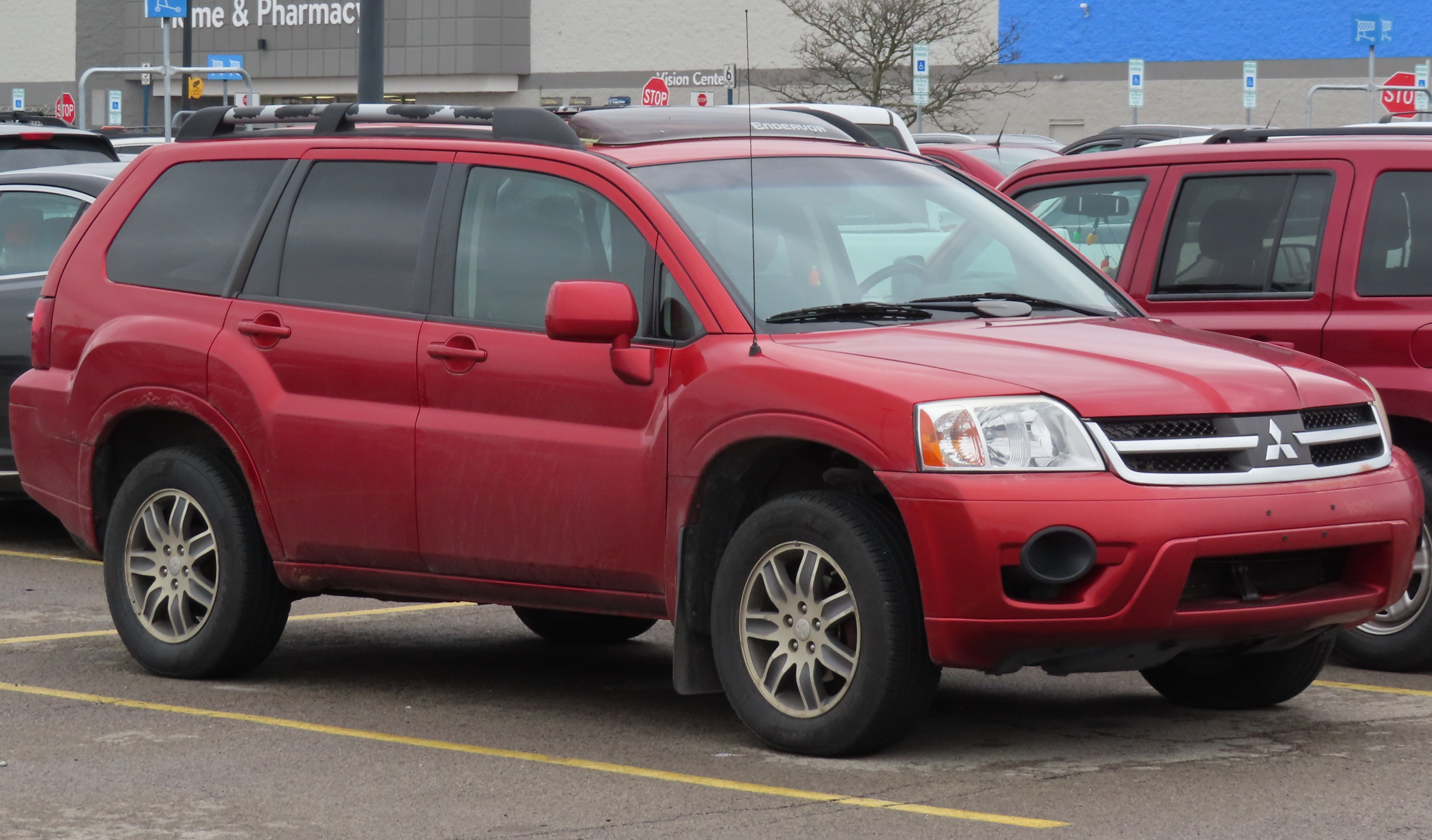
2006–2009 Mitsubishi Endeavor

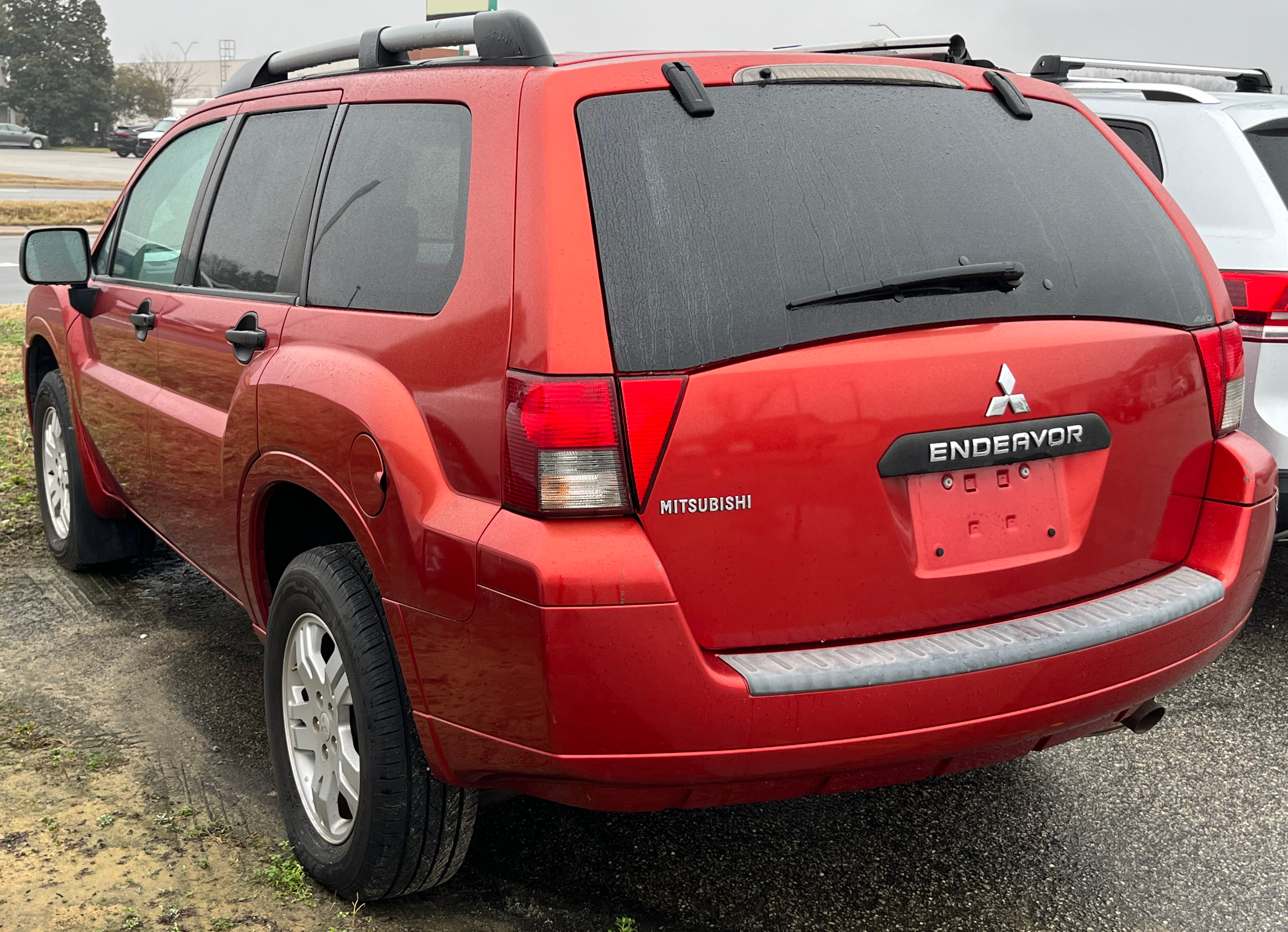
2006–2009 Mitsubishi Endeavor – Rear

Its design origins can be traced back to the Mitsubishi SSU which debuted at the 1999 North American International Auto Show, although the Endeavor does not share the concept's mechanical underpinnings. The prototype was powered by a 305 hp (227 kW) version of the 6A13TT 2.5-liter twin-turbo V6 gasoline, which directed the power to a full-time all-wheel drive system through its INVECS-II five-speed automatic transmission and AYC. When the Endeavor debuted in March 2003, it used the 6G75 3.8-liter V6 gasoline produces 215 hp (160 kW) and 250 lb⋅ft (339 N⋅m), mated to a four-speed automatic transmission with an optional all-wheel-drive system that splits the torque 50/50 by default.

Despite some reasonably favorable reviews on its release, the Endeavor's performance in the marketplace failed to meet Mitsubishi's expectations. On its release in March 2003 the company aimed for 80,000 annual sales but had achieved only 32,054 by the end of its debut year, and sales fell every year thereafter.

== History ==
In April 2004, the Endeavor received a mid-year upgrade, improving standard equipment which included daytime running lamps, dual-stage airbags with occupant sensors in front, and a tire-pressure monitor became standard. Some versions received additional upgrades, such as standard side impact airbags on the XLS, while new options included a rear-seat DVD system and traction and stability control. The 2004.5 update also brought a slight increase in power, up to 225 hp (168 kW) and 255 lb⋅ft (346 N⋅m). The Endeavor received a mild restyle for the 2006 model year.

Mitsubishi did not produce any 2009 Endeavor models for the retail market. However, they did produce a 2009 model for fleet customers which shared the exterior appearance with the incoming 2010 model and came equipped with cloth interior and Bluetooth. For the 2010 model year, the Endeavor received a facelift, with new front and rear facias. The 2010 Endeavor went on sale in June 2009. It only came in one trim level for 2010, lacking the navigation package of the 2008 Limited trim, but equipped with leather seating and hands-free Bluetooth calling.

On April 25, 2011, it was announced that Endeavor production would end in August 2011.

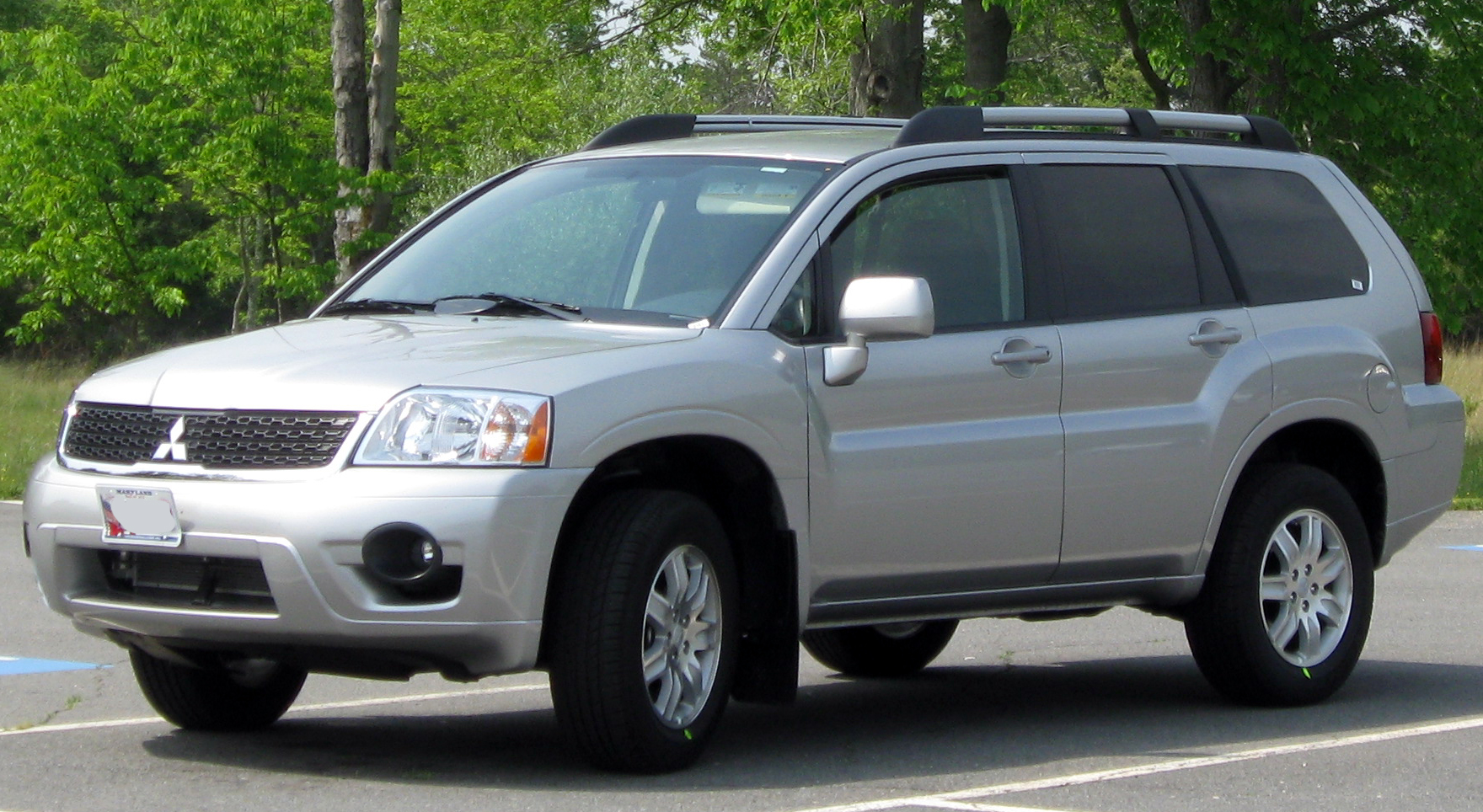
2009–2011 Mitsubishi Endeavor

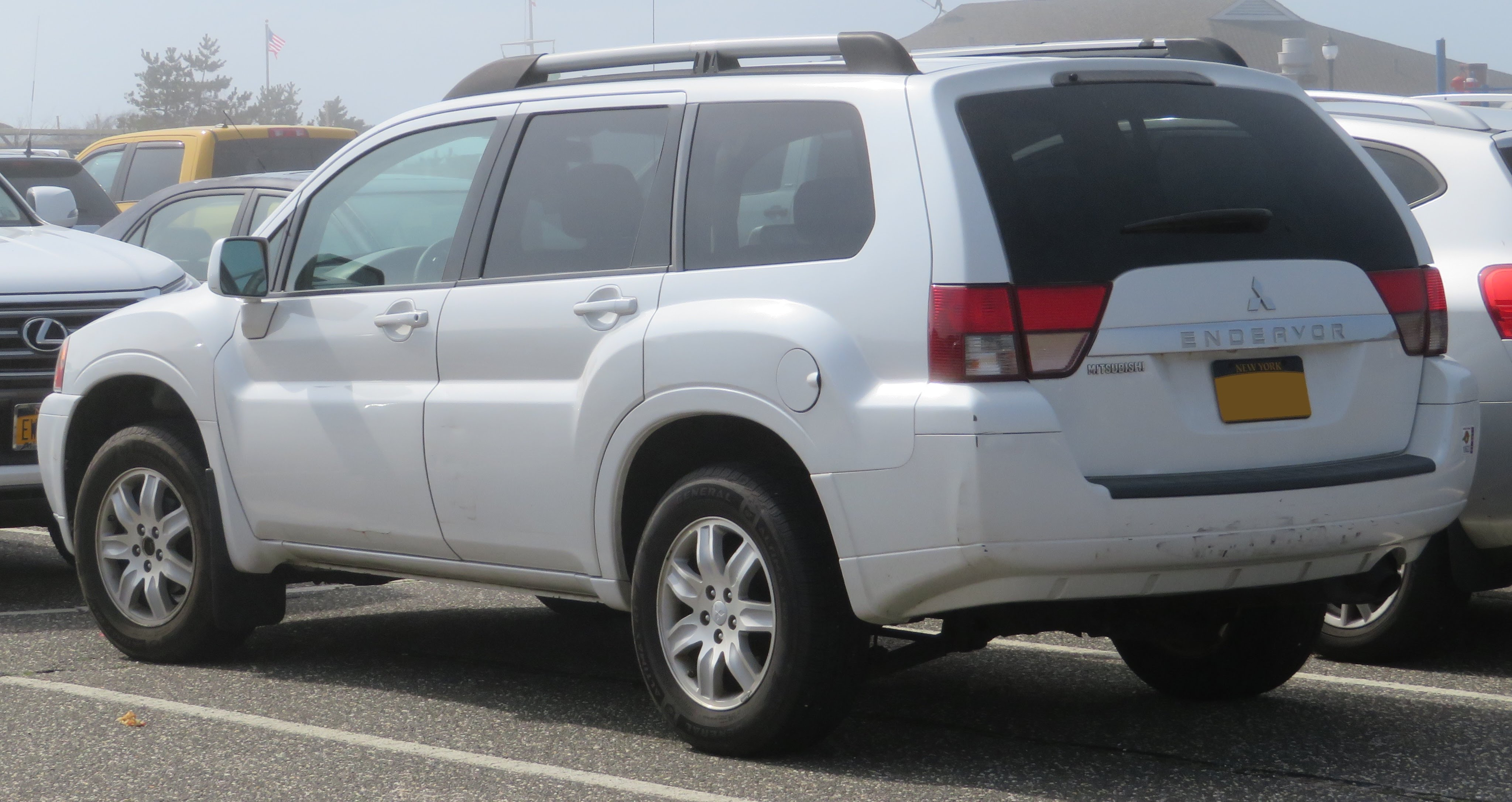
Rear view

== Annual production and sales ==
Year	Production	Sales (USA only)
2002	10	-
2003	48,987	39,181
2004	19,448	20,920
2005	22,403	18,568
2006	18,097	14,043
2007	13,465	10,669
2008	2,316	4,342
2009	5,401	4,057
2010	6,444	4,433
2011	8,607	8,324
2012	-	255
