= Riza (disambiguation) =

A riza is a metal cover protecting an icon.

Riza may also refer to:

- Riza Santos, Canadian television personality
- Riri Riza, Indonesian film director
- Reza (name), often spelled as Rıza
- Riza, South Khorasan, a village in South Khorasan Province, Iran
- Rijksinstituut voor Integraal Zoetwaterbeheer en Afvalwaterbehandeling (RIZA), National Institute for Inland Water Management and Waste Water Treatment, part of Rijkswaterstaat
