= Riise =

Riise can refer to:

- John Arne Riise, retired Norwegian football player
- Albert Heinrich Riise, Danish pharmacist and manufacturer on St. Thomas in the Danish West Indies
- Bjørn Helge Riise, Norwegian retired football player
- Hege Riise, retired football player, formerly with Carolina Courage, and former captain of Norway women's national team
