= 57th Army =

57th Army may refer to:

- Fifty-Seventh Army (Japan), Imperial Japanese Army
- 57th Army (Soviet Union)

== See also ==
- List of armies by number
- 57th Division (disambiguation)
- 57th Brigade (disambiguation)
- 57th Regiment (disambiguation)
- 57th Squadron (disambiguation)
- 57th (disambiguation)
