= LVII Corps =

LVII Corps or 57th Corps may refer to:

- 57th Corps (German Empire)
- LVII Panzer Corps, Wehrmacht, Germany

== See also ==
- List of military corps by number
- 57th Army (disambiguation)
- 57th Brigade (disambiguation)
- 57th Division (disambiguation)
- 57th Regiment (disambiguation)
- 57th (disambiguation)
