= 57th Rifle Division =

57th Rifle Division may refer to:

- 57th Rifle Division (RSFSR), 1919–1920
- 57th Rifle Division (Soviet Union), 1921–1940; 1946–1947
- 57th Motor Rifle Division, Soviet Union, 1940–1946
- 57th Guards Rifle Division, Soviet Union, 1942–1957
- 57th Guards Motor Rifle Division, Soviet Union, 1957–1993

== See also ==
- 57th Division (disambiguation)
