= 57th =

57th is the ordinal form of the number 57. 57th or Fifty-seventh may also refer to:

- A fraction, 1/57, equal to one of 57 equal parts

== Geography ==
- 57th meridian east, a line of longitude
- 57th meridian west, a line of longitude
- 57th parallel north, a circle of latitude
- 57th parallel south, a circle of latitude
- 57th Street (disambiguation)

== Military ==
- 57th Brigade (disambiguation)
- 57th Division (disambiguation)
- 57th Regiment (disambiguation)
- 57th Squadron (disambiguation)

== Other ==
- 57th century
- 57th century BC

== See also ==
- 57 (disambiguation)
- 57th & 9th, 2016 album by British singer-songwriter Sting
