= Type 57 =

Type 57 may refer to:

- Bugatti Type 57, a 1930s car
- Cadillac Type 57, a 1910s-1920s car
- Peugeot Type 57, a 1904 car
- Hispano-Suiza Type 57, a V-12 aeroengine
- Bristol Type 57 Grampus V, an interwar British biplane passenger aircraft
- Vickers Type 57 Virginia, an interwar British biplane heavy bomber aircraft
- Type 57 heavy machine gun, the Chinese variant of the SG-43 Goryunov

== See also ==
- T57 (disambiguation)
- 57 (disambiguation)
