= 57 =

57 may refer to:

- 57 (number), the natural number following 56 and preceding 58
- one of the years 57 BC, AD 57, 1957, 2057
- "57" (song), a song by Biffy Clyro
- "Fifty Seven", a song by Karma to Burn from the album Arch Stanton, 2014
- "57" (album), a studio album by Klaus Major Heuser Band in 2014
- "57 Live" (album), a live double-album by Klaus Major Heuser Band in 2015
- Heinz 57 (varieties), a former advertising slogan
- Maybach 57, an ultra-luxury car
- American Base Hospital No. 57
- Swift Current 57's, baseball team in the Western Canadian Baseball League
- FN Five-seveN, a semi-automatic pistol
- 57 Mnemosyne, a main-belt asteroid
- Tatra 57, a compact car

== See also ==
- 57th (disambiguation)
