= Mitsubishi Grandis =

MPV manufactured by Mitsubishi Motors

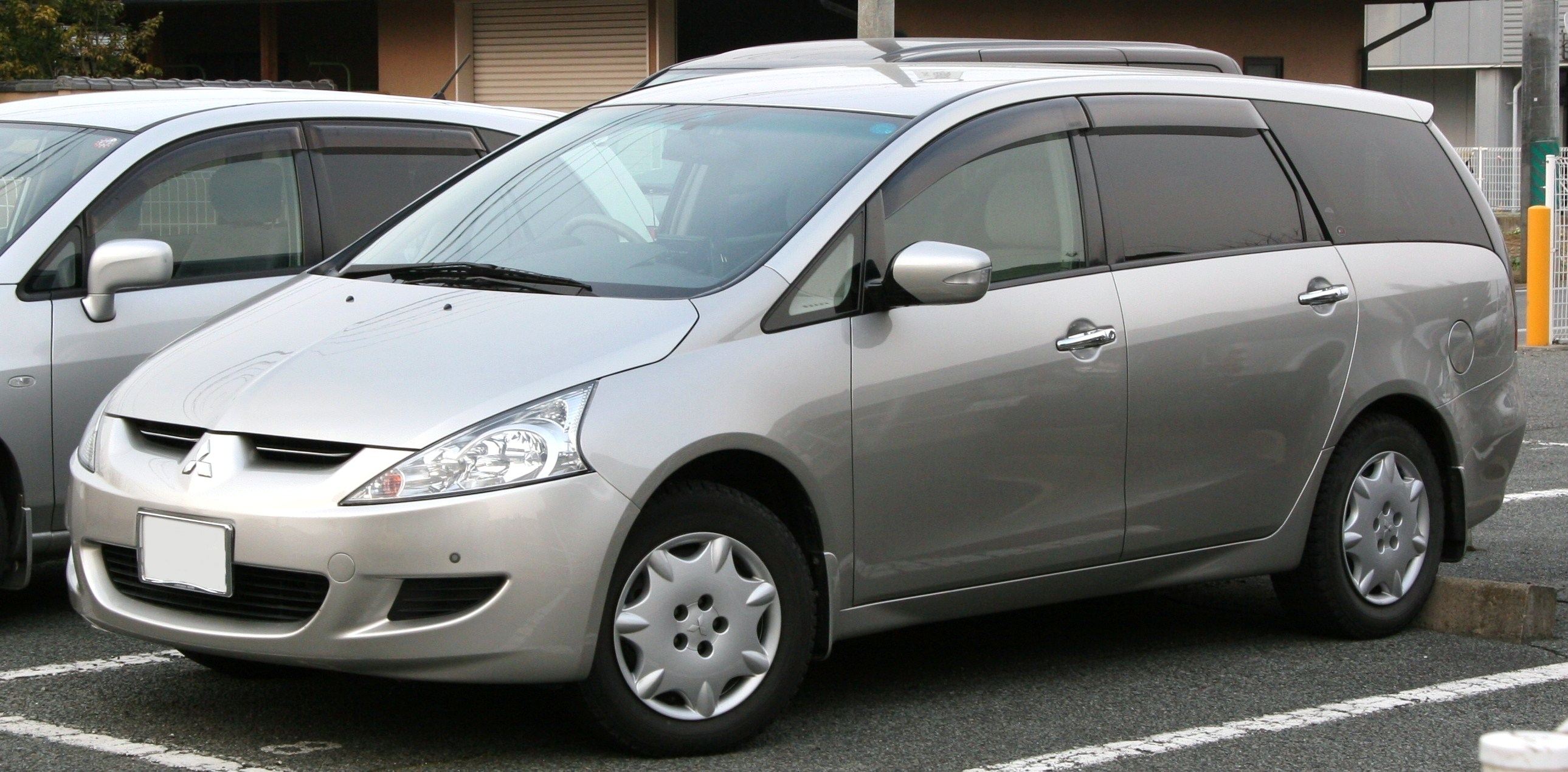
- Mitsubishi Grandis (Japan; pre-facelift)

Overview
- Manufacturer: Mitsubishi Motors
- Model code: NA; BA
- Also called: Mitsubishi Space Wagon (Thailand)
- Production: 2003–2011
- Assembly: Japan: Okazaki, Aichi (Nagoya plant); Thailand: Laem Chabang (MMTh)
- Designer: Olivier Boulay

Body and chassis
- Class: Mid-size MPV
- Body style: 5-door wagon
- Layout: Front-engine, front-wheel-drive; Front-engine, four-wheel-drive
- Related: Mitsubishi Outlander; Forthing Jingyi X5

Powertrain
- Engine: Petrol: 2.4 L 4G69 SOHC MIVEC I4 (NA4W); Diesel: 2.0 L VAG BSY/BWC DI-D PD turbo I4 (NA8W)
- Power output: 121 kW (162 hp; 165 PS) (4G69)
- Transmission: 5-speed manual; 6-speed manual (diesel only); 4-speed INVECS-II automatic (petrol only)

Dimensions
- Wheelbase: 2,830 mm (111.4 in)
- Length: 4,765–4,780 mm (187.6–188.2 in)
- Width: 1,795–1,835 mm (70.7–72.2 in)
- Height: 1,655–1,700 mm (65.2–66.9 in)
- Kerb weight: 1,655–1,725 kg (3,649–3,803 lb)

Chronology
- Predecessor: Mitsubishi Chariot
- Successor: Mitsubishi Delica D:5 / Delica Space Wagon

The Mitsubishi Grandis (Japanese: 三菱・グランディス, Hepburn: Mitsubishi Gurandisu) is a seven-seat MPV built by Mitsubishi Motors between 2003 and 2011. It was introduced to replace the Chariot/Space Wagon/Nimbus minivans. It was also marketed as the Mitsubishi Space Wagon in Thailand.

== Overview ==
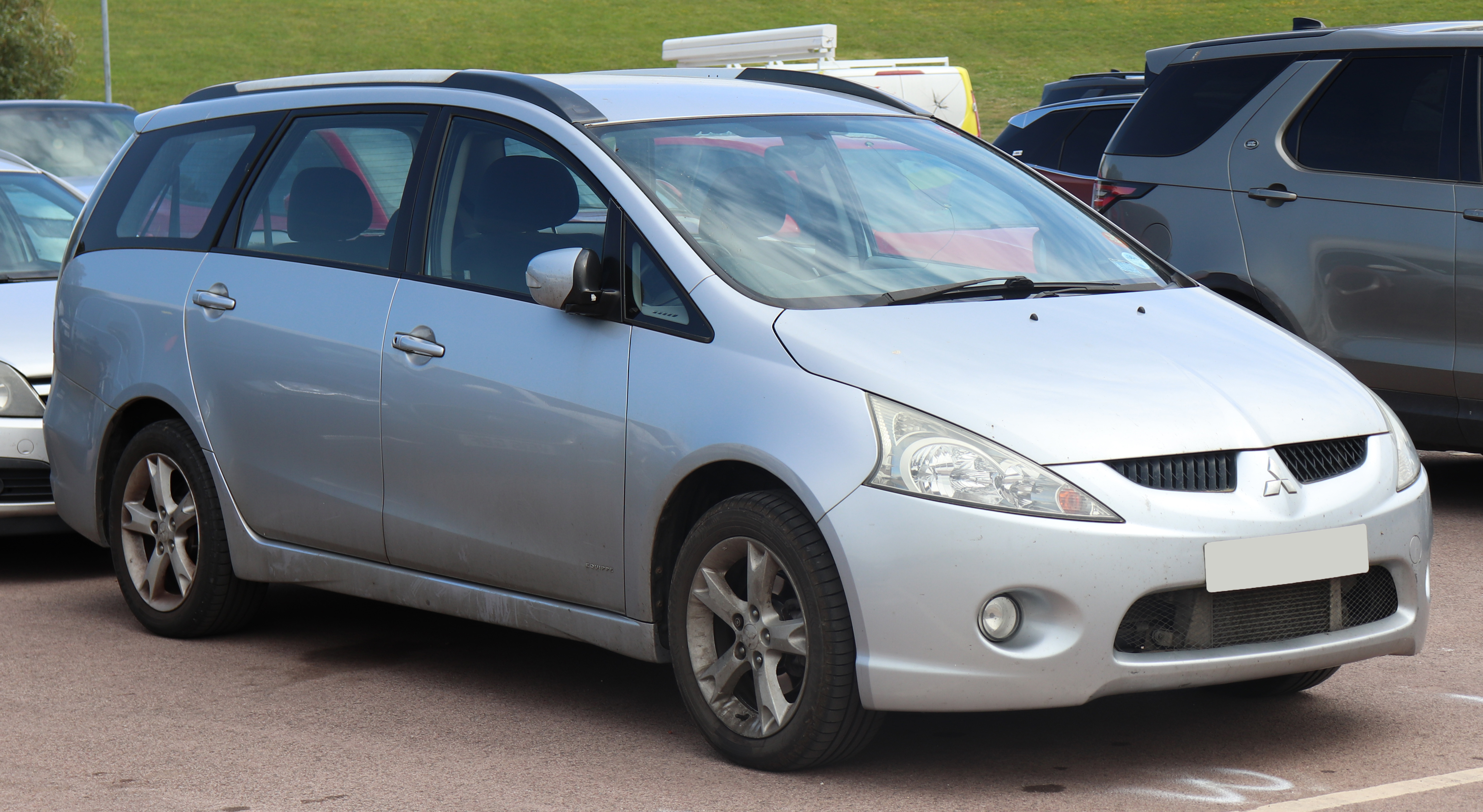

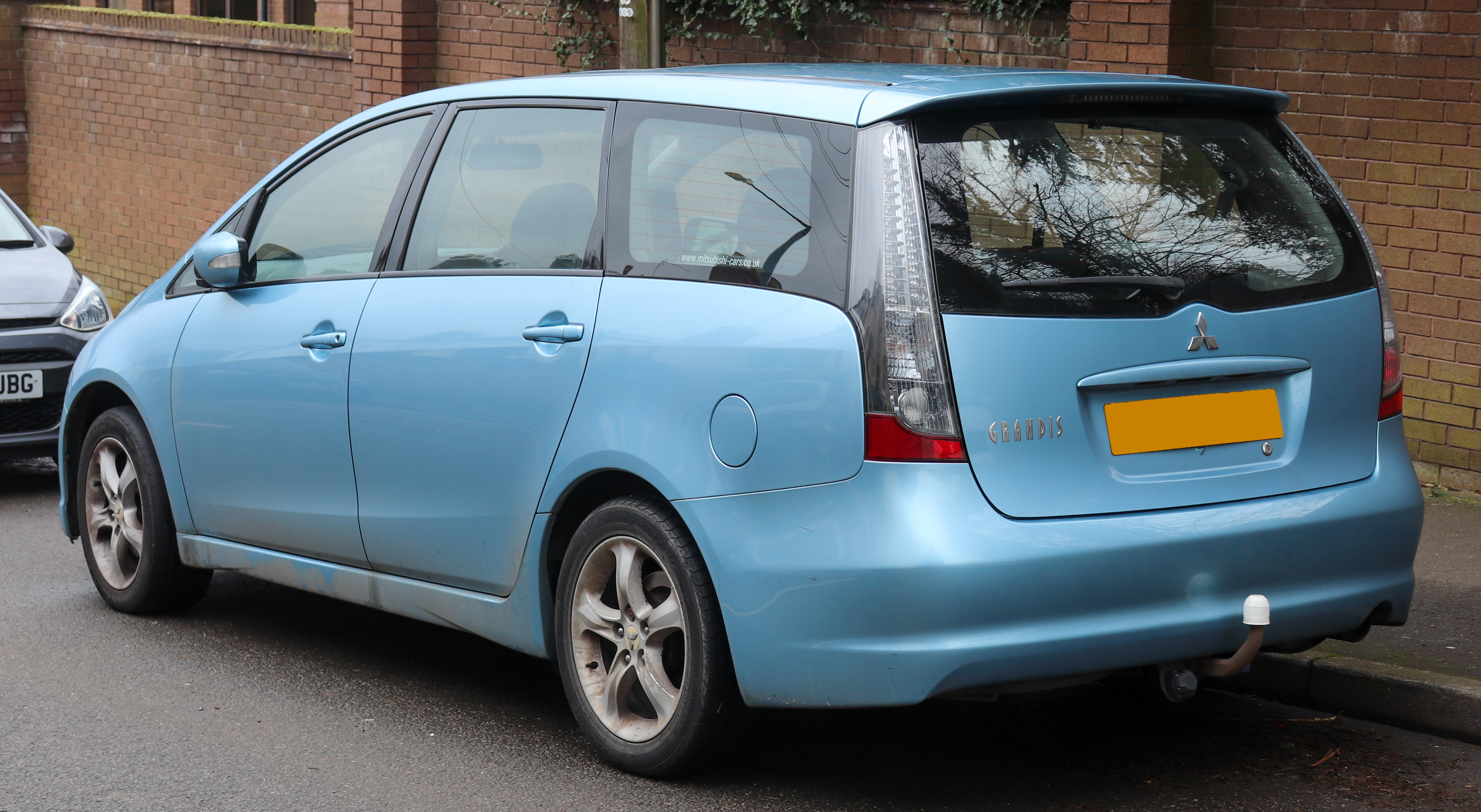
Mitsubishi Grandis Equippe (UK)

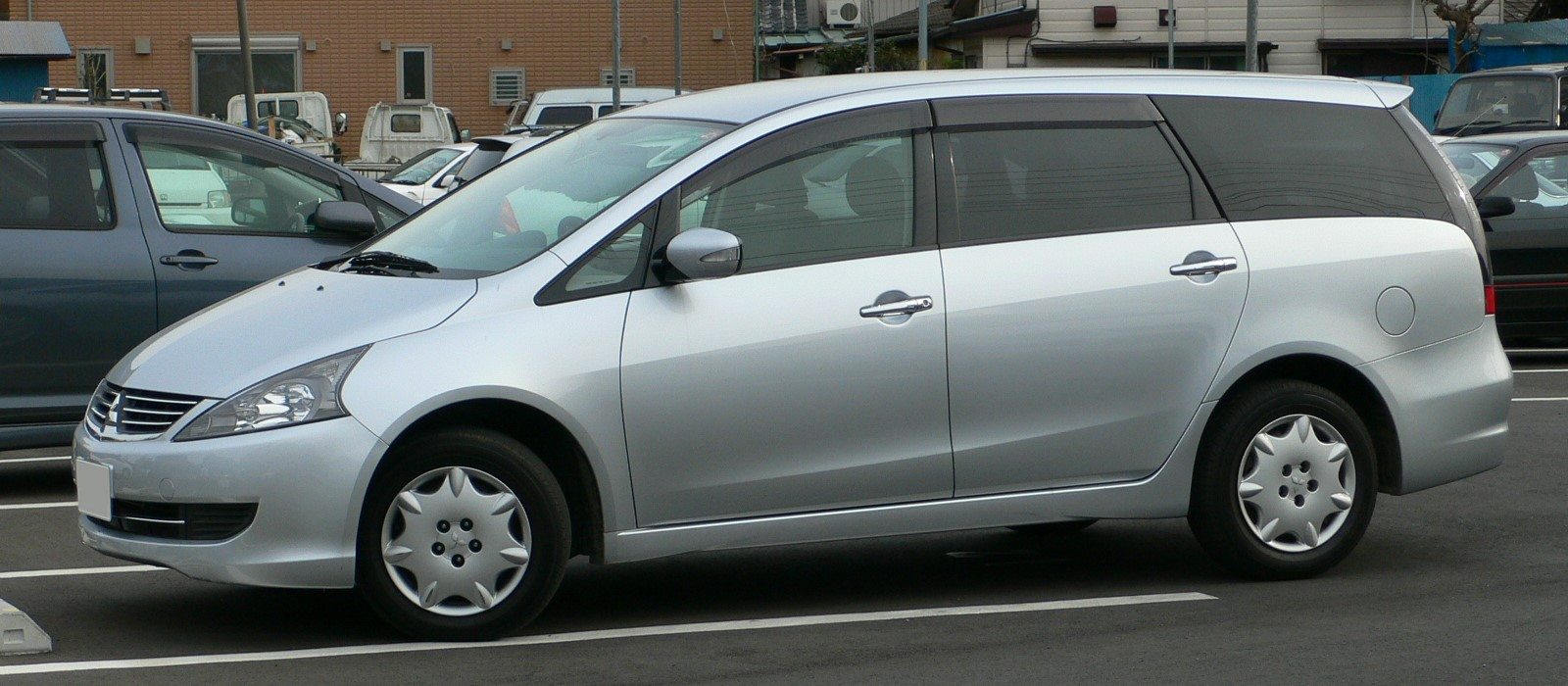
Mitsubishi Grandis (Japan; facelift)

The Grandis was launched on 14 May 2003 as a 2004 model year vehicle and sold in Japan, Asia, Europe, Oceania, Mexico, Honduras, Jamaica and South America.

The exterior styling was based loosely on designer Olivier Boulay's earlier Mitsubishi Space Liner, a monobox four-seat concept vehicle with centre opening "suicide doors", first exhibited at the Tokyo Motor Show in October 2001.

It was the first all new vehicle featuring the company's new common "face", comprising a curved lower grille edge and a sharp crease rising up the leading edge of the bonnet from the prominent corporate badge. It shared its platform with the Mitsubishi Airtrek, minus the increased ground clearance.

The Grandis was also the basis for the Mitsubishi FCV (Fuel Cell Vehicle) concept, powered by a fuel cell technology developed by then controlling shareholder DaimlerChrysler. DCX's "FC System" uses a fuel cell stack to replenish an array of NiMH batteries from 117 litres of compressed hydrogen storage.

The Grandis was launched in Malaysia on 28 July 2005 in conjunction with Mitsubishi's return to Malaysia. The Grandis was updated in Malaysia in September 2007, July 2009 and in August 2010.

It won the Best MPV award at the Bangkok International Motor Show from 2005 to 2010. During March 2009, it saw the cancellation of this model in the Japanese market. In 2011, it was discontinued globally.

== Powertrain ==
Engines available were a 2.4-litre four-cylinder and a Europe-only Volkswagen sourced 2.0-litre turbodiesel, badged DI-D rather than TDI as Volkswagen denotes it. The diesel model arrived in conjunction with the Grandis' European launch in 2004. It originally used the 136 PS (100 kW) BSY version of Volkswagen's Pumpe Düse diesel engine; in 2008 it was changed to the 140 PS (103 kW) BWC variant of the same with no declared performance changes.

== Annual production and sales ==
Year	Production	Sales	
Year	Production	Japan	Overseas
2003	28,821	23,834	3,574
2004	19,173	5,247	14,352
2005	29,466	4,490	24,507
2006	17,928	1,756	16,870
2007	15,549	674	15,161
2008	8,583	281	8,283

(source: Facts & Figures 2008, Facts & Figures 2009, Mitsubishi Motors website)

== Nameplate use for other models ==
The Grandis nameplate was reintroduced in July 2025 as a crossover SUV based on the Renault Symbioz.

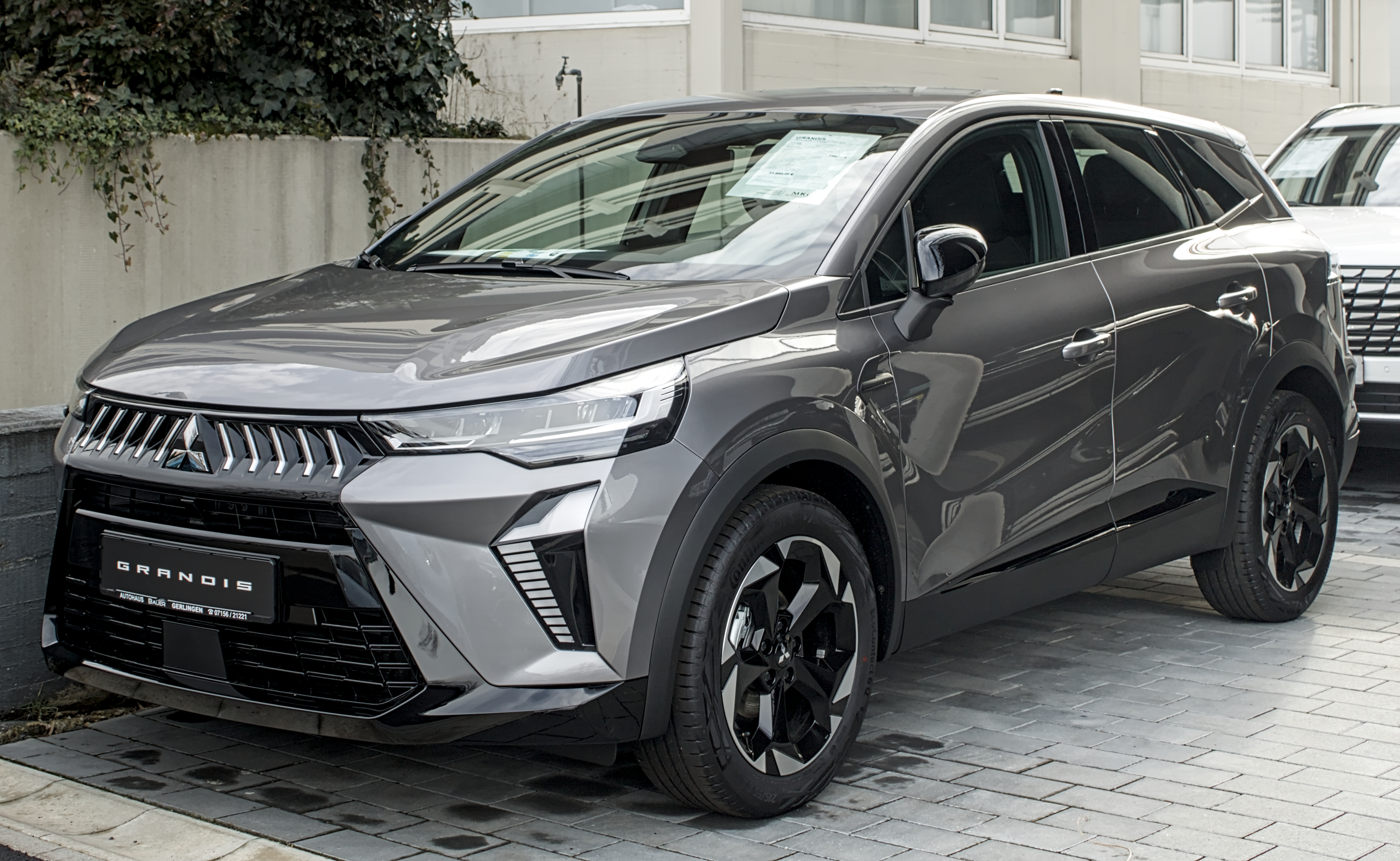
Renault Symbioz-based Grandis SUV

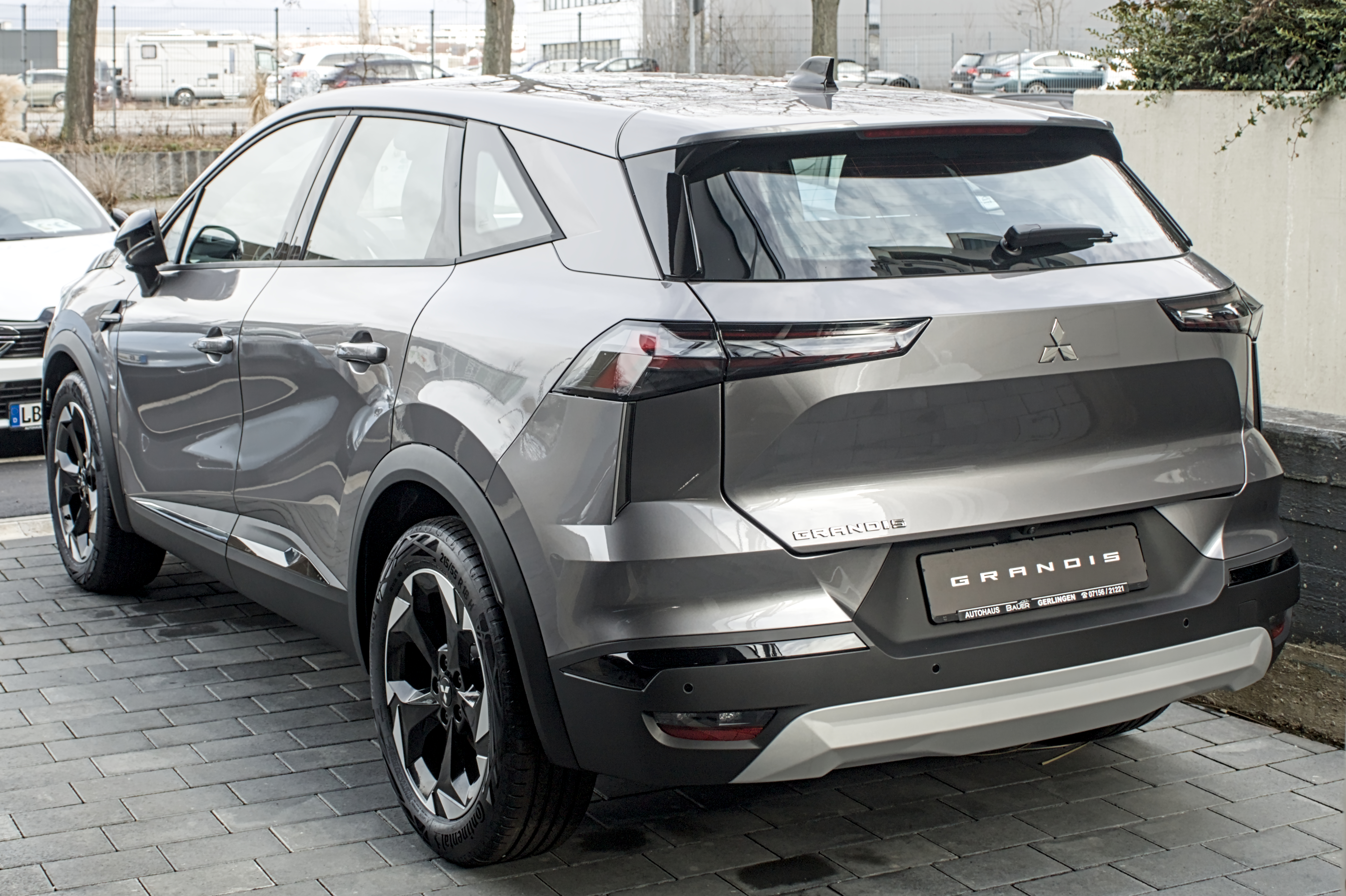
Rear view
