= Independent Division of Qinghai Provincial Military District (2nd Formation) =

Independent Division of Xinjiang Military District (1966–69) Independent Division of Qinghai Provincial Military District (1969–76)
- Active: 1966.8 - 1976.5
- Country: People's Republic of China
- Branch: People's Liberation Army
- Type: Division
- Role: Infantry

Independent Division of Xinjiang Military District (Chinese: 新疆军区独立师)(1st Formation) was formed in July 1966 from the Public Security Contingent of Xinjiang Uyghur Autonomous Region. The division was composed of three regiments (1st to 3rd).

On February 25, 1969, the division exchanged its designation and position with Independent Division of Qinghai Provincial Military District with all its remaining 3 regiments, and became the second formation of Independent Division of Qinghai Military District (Chinese: 青海省军区独立师). All its regiments were renamed as follows:

- 1st Regiment (former 2nd);
- 3rd Regiment (former 3rd);
- 7th Regiment (former 1st).

As of October 26, 1970 the division was composed of 7 regiments.

In May 1976 the division was disbanded.
