= 57th Division (2nd Formation) (People's Republic of China) =

32nd Garrison Division (1969) Garrison Division of Lanzhou Military Region (1969–81) 1st Garrison Division of Lanzhou Military Region (1981–82) 57th Army Division (1982-85)
- Active: ? - 1985.9
- Country: People's Republic of China
- Branch: People's Liberation Army
- Type: Division
- Role: Infantry, Garrison
- Part of: 19th Army Corps
- Garrison/HQ: Jiuquan, Gansu

32nd Garrison Division (Chinese: 守备第32师) was formed in October 1969 from 1st Engineer District, Engineer Troops of Lanzhou Military Region.

The division was composed of 3 regiments. after December 1969 these regiments were renamed as:

- 1st Garrison Regiment;
- 2nd Garrison Regiment;
- 3rd Garrison Regiment.

The division was stationed in Jiuquan, Gansu, as the garrison unit of Dongfeng Space Center.

From late 1969 the division was transferred to newly reformed 19th Army Corps. In December the division was renamed as Garrison Division of Lanzhou Military Region(Chinese: 兰州军区守备师).

In 1976 Artillery Regiment was activated.

From January 1981, the division was renamed as 1st Garrison Division of Lanzhou Military Region(Chinese: 兰州军区守备第1师)(1st formation) following 2nd Garrison Division of Lanzhou Military Region's activation.

From November 1982, the division was renamed as 57th Army Division(Chinese: 陆军第57师). The division's unit code by then was Military Unit 84707.

The division was then composed of:

- 169th Infantry Regiment;
- 170th Infantry Regiment;
- 171st Infantry Regiment;
- Artillery Regiment.

In September 1985, the division was disbanded along with the Army Corps.
