= Olivier Boulay =

Automobile designer

Olivier Boulay (born August 9, 1957, in France) is an automobile designer. Since 2009, he has been the Vice President of Daimler's Advanced Design Centre in Beijing, China.

He was educated at École supérieure d'art graphique et d'architecture intérieure in Paris until June 1981, and graduated from the Royal College of Art in London a year later. He then spent five years as an automotive designer in France and Italy before becoming the Manager of Daimler-Benz AG's Design Division in West Germany in 1987. He was responsible for the S-Class and C-Class exteriors while there, before moving to Japan in 1989. Boulay penned the second generation Subaru Legacy while working for Fuji Heavy Industries, before returning to Daimler Benz in 1992 when they established their Advanced Design Center of Japan. As general manager, Boulay was behind the 97 Maybach concept exhibited at the Tokyo Motor Show, before returning to Europe as General Manager of DaimlerChrysler's Advanced Design Germany studio to usher the Maybach 57 and 62 limousines into production.

Following DaimlerChrysler's assumption of control of Mitsubishi Motors, Boulay was appointed the head of Mitsubishi Motors' design office in May 2001. The continual financial struggle of Mitsubishi Motors hastened DaimlerChrysler's exit from being the company's biggest stockholder. It meant that only one all-new vehicle, the Mitsubishi Magna, was developed and released during his tenure. However, he was able to exert his stylistic influence on several other vehicles in development, thanks to a heavy schedule of four concept vehicles created in five months prior to the 2001 Tokyo Motor Show. These concepts, the CZ2, CZ3 Tarmac, Space Liner and SUP, all shared a common face created by the curvature of the lower edge of the grille, the size and shape of the badge and the sharp crease rising up the leading edge of the bonnet. Boulay saw this family likeness as important in establishing a strong image for the company. This would later be seen in his facelift of the Australian market Mitsubishi Magna in 2003, its successful replacement the Mitsubishi 380, and the Japanese Mitsubishi i kei car, the latter two of which would only be released after Boulay had left the company.

When DaimlerChrysler terminated its alliance with Mitsubishi in 2004, Boulay, returned to its Advanced Design Studio in Japan and his previous position. He became a professor at Keio University in Tokyo in 2009, and was named Vice President of the Mercedes-Benz Advanced Design Center of China, which opened new premises in Beijing in July 2011 where he is responsible for electric car design development for the joint venture with BYD.
