= Vyacheslav Tsvetayev =

Vyacheslav Tsvetaev
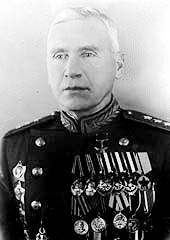
- Tsvetaev sometime after 1942
- Native name: Вячеслав Дмитриевич Цветаев
- Born: 17 January 1893; Maloarkhangelsk, Oryol Oblast, Russian Empire
- Died: 11 August 1950 (aged 57) Moscow, Russian SFSR, Soviet Union
- Allegiance: Russian Empire (1914–1917); Russian SFSR (1917–1922); Soviet Union (1922–1948)
- Branch: Imperial Russian Army; Soviet Red Army
- Service years: 1914–1948
- Conflicts: World War I; Russian Civil War; Polish–Soviet War; World War II
- Awards: Hero of the Soviet Union

Vyacheslav Dmitrievich Tsvetaev (Russian: Вячеслав Дмитриевич Цветаев; 17 January 1893 – 11 August 1950) was a Soviet general and Hero of the Soviet Union.

== Biography ==
He was born into a family of railway workers in Maloarkhangelsk, Oryol Oblast.
He fought for the Imperial Russian Army in World War I and for the Bolsheviks in the subsequent civil war and in the war against Poland.

He became commander of the 56th Rifle Division between 1922 and 1926. In November 1926 he was transferred to the Central Asian Military District as commander of the 3rd Turkestan Rifle Division. In 1927 he graduated from the Frunze Military Academy. In November 1929 he was appointed commander of the 2nd Turkestan Rifle Division. For five years he participated in battles with the Basmachi movement in Southern Turkestan. Since 1931 he has been a senior lecturer at the Frunze Military Academy. In February 1937, he was appointed commander of the 57th Rifle Division in the Ural Military District.

On 5 July 1938, he was arrested and accused of espionage activities in favor of Germany. He was imprisoned in Chitina prison and tortured. However, he refused to plead guilty and was released on 9 September 1939 for lack of proof. He was allowed back in the Red Army and became senior lecturer, and since January 1941, head of the Department of General Tactics at the Frunze Military Academy.

=== World War II ===
At the outbreak of the Great Patriotic War, Tsvetaev became a member of the staff of the 7th Army of the Northern Front in Karelia. In the first half of 1942 he was deputy commander of the 4th Army of the Volkhov Front. From July 1942 he was commander of the 10th Reserve Army.
On 6 December 1942 he was appointed deputy commander, and from 26 December 1942 to May 1944 commander of the 5th Shock Army. Under his command, the army fought at Stalingrad and in Southern Ukraine. From May to September 1944 he was deputy commander of the 1st Belarusian Front. In September 1944 he was for 2 weeks the commander of the 6th Army and then until the end of the war he was the commander of the 33rd Army in the 1st Belarusian Front. With his army, he distinguished himself in the Vistula–Oder Offensive and Battle of Berlin.

For the skilful leadership of his troops, Colonel-General Tsvetaev Vyacheslav Dmitrievich was awarded the title of Hero of the Soviet Union, with the award of the Order of Lenin and the Gold Star Medal.

After the war, in July 1945, V.D. Tsvetaev was appointed deputy commander-in-chief, and from January 1947 commander-in-chief of the Southern Group of Forces.
Since January 1948 he was the head of the Frunze Military Academy.

Vyacheslav Tsvetaev died on August 11, 1950. He was buried in Moscow at the Novodevichy Cemetery.

== Sources ==
- the free dictionary
- generals.dk
- encyclopedia.mil.ru War heroes
