= Independent Division of Xinjiang Military District (2nd Formation) =

Independent Division of Qinghai Provincial Military District (1966–69) Independent Division of Xinjiang Military District (1969–82)
- Active: 1966.8 - 1982
- Country: People's Republic of China
- Branch: People's Liberation Army
- Type: Division
- Role: Infantry

Independent Division of Qinghai Provincial Military District (Chinese: 青海省军区独立师)(1st Formation) was formed on August 25, 1966, from the Public Security Contingent of Qinghai province. The division was composed of seven regiments (1st to 7th).

On February 23, 1967, under the command of Zhao Yongfu(Chinese: 赵永夫), deputy commander of Qinghai Provincial Military District a detachment from the division took part in the Qinghai Incident, during which it killed 169 unarmed civilians and injured 168. The incident became one of the most notorious massacres conducted by the People's Liberation Army during the Cultural Revolution.

In 1968, 2nd, 5th and 6th Regiment from the division exchanged designations and positions with 4th, 3rd Regiment of Shannxi Independent Division, and 4th Regiment of Gansu Independent Division.

On February 25, 1969, the division exchanged its designation and position with Independent Division of Xinjiang Military District with all its remaining 3 regiments, and became the second formation of Independent Division of Xinjiang Military District (Chinese: 新疆军区独立师). All its regiments were renamed as follows:

- 1st Regiment (former 7th);
- 2nd Regiment (former 1st);
- 3rd Regiment (former 3rd).

In 1982 the division converted to a People's Armed Police unit.
