= 57th Division =

In military terms, 57th Division may refer to:

== Infantry divisions ==
- 57th Division (2nd Formation) (People's Republic of China)
- 57th Infantry Division (France)
- 57th Infantry Division (Wehrmacht), Germany
- 57th Mountain Division, India)
- 57th Infantry Division "Lombardia", Kingdom of Italy
- 57th Division (Imperial Japanese Army)
- 57th Infantry Division (Russian Empire)
- 57th Rifle Division (RSFSR), Russian Red Army
- 57th Guards Rifle Division, Soviet Union, later the 57th Guards Motor Rifle Division
- 57th Rifle Division (Soviet Union), the 57th Motor Rifle Division during WWII
- 57 Division (Sri Lanka)
- 57th (2nd West Lancashire) Division, United Kingdom

== Aviation divisions ==
- 57th Air Division, United States

== Cavalry divisions ==
- 57th Cavalry Division, Soviet Union

== See also ==
- List of military divisions by number
- 57th Brigade (disambiguation)
- 57th Regiment (disambiguation)
- 57th Squadron (disambiguation)
