= Mitsubishi SUP =

Overview
- Manufacturer: Mitsubishi Motors
- Production: 2001
- Designer: Olivier Boulay

Body and chassis
- Class: Concept car
- Body style: 4-door hatchback

Dimensions
- Wheelbase: 2,620 mm (103.1 in)
- Length: 4,160 mm (163.8 in)
- Width: 1,850 mm (72.8 in)
- Height: 1,630 mm (64.2 in)

Olivier Boulay at the wheel of the SUP cabriolet.

The Mitsubishi SUP is a concept car developed by Mitsubishi Motors in 2001, first exhibited as a hardtop at the 35th Tokyo Motor Show in 2001, and later at the 2002 North American International Auto Show and Geneva Motor Show as a Mitsubishi SUP Cabriolet. The name SUP stands for "Sports Utility Pack", with Mitsubishi claiming that it was designed "for nature lovers who are...happy using hi-tech gadgets and gizmos Monday to Friday; then out for a bunch of fun communing with nature at weekends and holidays."

It was one of four concept vehicles produced by the company in the five-month period following the appointment of Olivier Boulay as its head of design in 2001, after DaimlerChrysler's purchase of a controlling interest in Mitsubishi Motors. Boulay, the General Manager of DCX's Advanced Design Studio in Yokohama, was seconded to MMC, and immediately began creating a strong image for their cars through a common "face" seen on all the concepts, in the curvature of the lower edge of the grille, the size and shape of the badge and the sharp crease rising up the leading edge of the bonnet. More radical styling concepts included the thick wraparound tubeline encircling the body which also housed the front and rear lamp units, detachable, semi-transparent body panels in the doors, and seatback-mounted backpacks. The hardtop's large louvred sunroof was replaced by a convertible top and hideaway rear glass in the cabriolet.

Under the skin, the SUP was equipped with a "soft HEV" 4WD drivetrain; an automated manual transmission channelled power from a 1,999 cc 4G94 gasoline direct injection straight-4 with integrated starter alternator (GDI-ISA) to the front wheels, with two discreet electric motors powering the rears.
