= 57th Brigade =

57th Brigade of 57th Infantry Brigade may refer to:

== India ==
- 57th Indian Brigade of the British Indian Army in the First World War

== Russia ==
- 57th Separate Guards Motor Rifle Brigade

== Soviet Union ==
- 57th Separate Airborne Brigade

== Ukraine ==
- 57th Motorized Brigade

== United Kingdom ==
- 57th Anti-Aircraft Brigade
- 57th Brigade (United Kingdom)

=== Artillery units ===
- 57th (Howitzer) Brigade, Royal Field Artillery, of the British Army in the First World War
- 57th (Home Counties) Brigade, Royal Field Artillery, of the British Army after the First World War
- 57th (Lowland) Medium Brigade, Royal Garrison Artillery

== United States ==
- 57th Field Artillery Brigade
- 57th Ordnance Brigade

== See also ==
- 57th Division (disambiguation)
- 57th Regiment (disambiguation)
