= Leonty Ugryumov =

- Born: 1887; Usolye, Ural Oblast (Russian Empire)
- Died: August 14, 1937 (aged 49–50) Moscow, Soviet Union
- Allegiance: Russian Empire; Soviet Union
- Branch: Imperial Russian Army; Soviet Red Army
- Service years: 1918–1937 (Soviet Union)
- Rank: Komkor
- Conflicts: World War I Russian Civil War

Leonty Yakovlevich Ugyumov (Russian: Леонтий Яковлевич Угрюмов; 1887 – August 14, 1937) was a Soviet komkor (corps commander). He was born in what is now Usolye, Usolsky District, Perm Krai. He fought for the Imperial Russian Army during World War I before going over to the Bolsheviks during the subsequent civil war. He led several Red Army units, including the 57th Rifle Division and temporarily the 4th Army.

During the Great Purge, he was arrested on May 21, 1937, and later executed. After the death of Joseph Stalin, he was rehabilitated on May 23, 1956.
