= T57 =

T57 may refer to:

- T57 (album), a 2007 album by American gospel group Trin-i-tee 5:7
- T57 (classification), a disability sport classification
- Cooper T57, a British sports racing car
- Garland/DFW Heloplex, a heliport in Garland, Texas, FAA location identifier T57
- Jiabao T57, a Chinese truck
- Pratt & Whitney T57, an early turboprop engine
- Slingsby T.57, a replica Sopwith Camel biplane
- T57 heavy tank, an American experimental tank
- T57 Motor Gun Carriage, a proposed self-propelled gun based on the M3 Stuart light tank

== See also ==
- Type 57 (disambiguation)
