= 57th Street =

57th Street or 57th Street station may refer to:

- 57th Street (Manhattan)
- 57th Street station (IND Sixth Avenue Line)
- 57th Street station (IRT Second Avenue Line) (demolished)

== See also ==
- 55th/56th/57th Street station, or "57th Street station", a Metra/South Shore Line stop in Chicago
- 57th Street–Seventh Avenue station, a New York City subway station
