= Maybach 57 and 62 =

Maybach 57/62 (W240/V240)
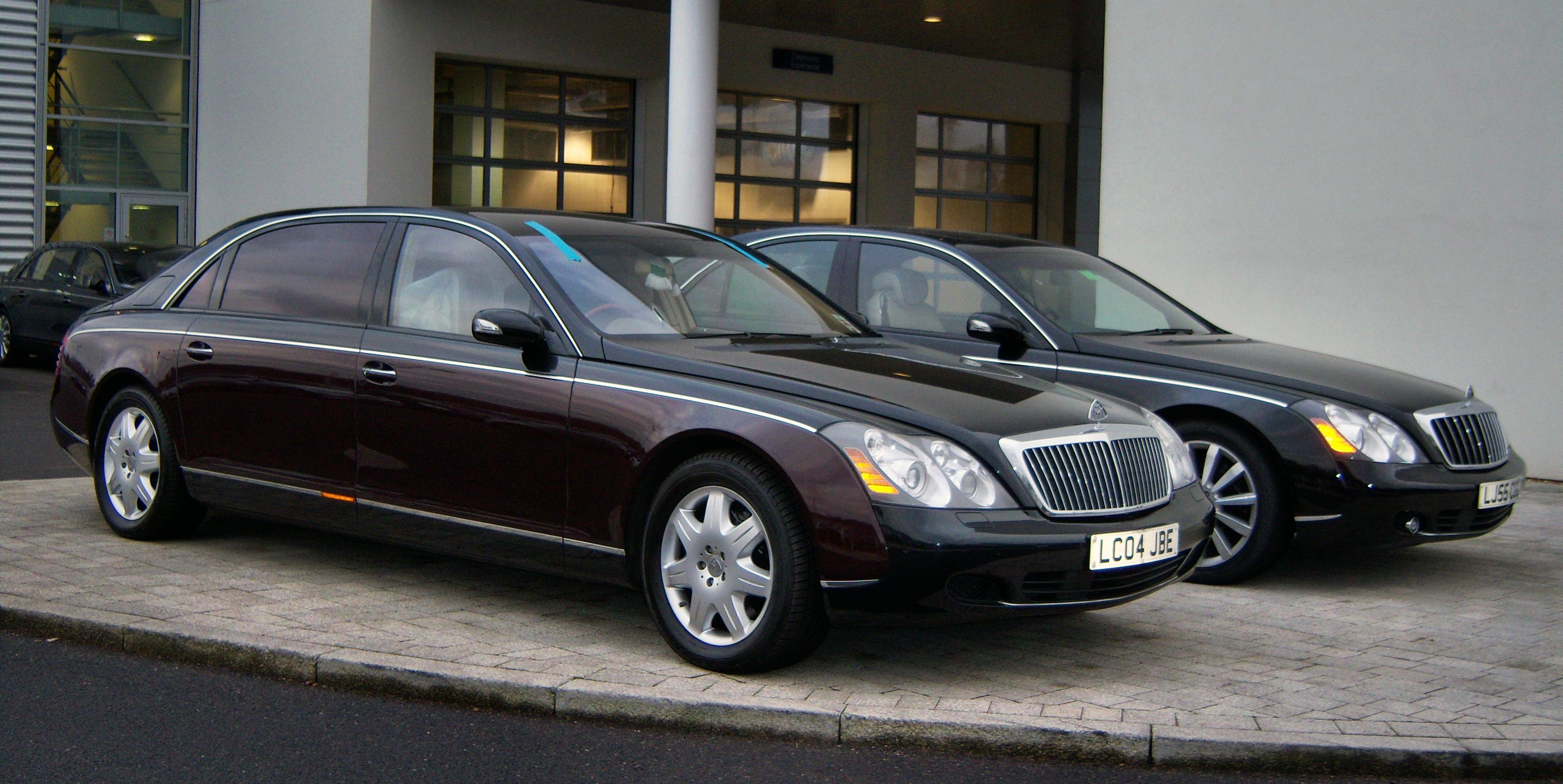
- Maybach 62, with a Maybach 57 on the right

Overview
- Manufacturer: DaimlerChrysler (2002–2007); Daimler AG (2007–2013)
- Production: April 2002 – February 2013; 3,321 produced
- Model years: 2003–2013
- Assembly: Germany: Sindelfingen
- Designer: Olivier Boulay, Shuichi Yamashita, Anthony Lo (1996)

Body and chassis
- Class: Ultra-luxury car (F)
- Body style: 4-door saloon 4-door landaulet
- Layout: Front-engine, rear-wheel-drive
- Related: Mercedes-Benz S-Class W140; Mercedes-Benz S-Class W220

Powertrain
- Engine: 5.5 L M285 twin-turbo V12; 6.0 L M285 twin-turbo V12
- Transmission: 5-speed 5G-Tronic automatic

Dimensions
- Wheelbase: 57: 3,390 mm (133.5 in); 62: 3,827 mm (150.7 in)
- Length: 2002–2010 57: 5,728 mm (225.5 in); 2010–2013 57: 5,734 mm (225.7 in); 2002–2010 62: 6,165 mm (242.7 in); 2010–2013 62: 6,171 mm (243.0 in)
- Width: 1,980 mm (78.0 in)
- Height: 1,557–1,575 mm (61.3–62.0 in)
- Curb weight: 2,735 kg (6,030 lb) (57); 2,805 kg (6,184 lb) (62)

Chronology
- Predecessor: Mercedes-Benz 600 (1963–1981)
- Successor: Mercedes-Maybach (indirect)

The Maybach 57 (W240) and 62 (V240) were the first automobile models of the Maybach brand since its revival by Mercedes-Benz Group AG. They are derived from the Mercedes-Benz Maybach concept car presented at the 1997 Tokyo Motor Show. Both concept models were based on a heavily reengineered version of the Mercedes-Benz W140 S-Class platform and were developed as ultra-luxury flagships positioned above the S-Class. Conceived as the most luxurious automobiles of their era, the Maybach 57 and 62 emphasized rear-seat comfort. It marked the continuation of the brand’s ultra-luxury, top of the line model after a hiatus of over two decades since the previous model, the Mercedes-Benz 600. The revived Maybach brand was intended to symbolize technical excellence, status, and uncompromising luxury at the highest level of the automotive market like the Mercedes-Benz 600.

== History ==
Wilhelm Maybach was an engineer who worked with Gottlieb Daimler to design combustion engines. The first Daimler-Maybach automobile was built in 1889. Over the years, the Maybach name developed into a brand name for automobiles that were typically very large, powerful, and luxurious. For example, the Maybach Zeppelin DS 8 Cabriolet built in 1929 had side sections that could be lowered completely to allow it to be used as a parade car. In 1998, DaimlerChrysler AG's competitor, BMW AG, purchased the brand Rolls-Royce. The Maybach brand name was reintroduced in 2002 to be a direct challenger to BMW's top vehicle, the Rolls-Royce Phantom, even though the Maybach conquered an even larger price bracket. The Maybach 57 and Maybach 62 were developed as the successors to the Mercedes-Benz 600, a model that had represented the pinnacle of luxury, engineering, and prestige during its time.

== Design ==
Both Maybach models are variants of the same ultra-luxurious automobile. The model numbers reflect the respective lengths of the automobiles in decimetres. The 57 is more likely to be owner-driven, while the longer 62 is designed with a chauffeur in mind.

=== Features ===
Standard features of all models include, but are not limited to: a navigation system with voice recognition; power rear sunshade; rear-seat DVD entertainment system; interior air filter; front and rear seat massage; 21-speaker Bose premium sound system; power tilt/telescopic heated leather-wrapped-wood steering wheel with radio and climate controls; power trunk open/close; voice-activated AM/FM radio with 6-disc CD changer; keyless start; heated front and rear seats; cooled front seats; adaptive cruise control; premium leather upholstery; 18-way power front seats; 14-way power rear seats; heated cupholders; rear beverage refrigerator; rear pop-out folding table trays; rearview camera; pneumatic soft close doors; iPod adapter; wireless cell phone link; outside-temperature indicator; universal garage door opener.

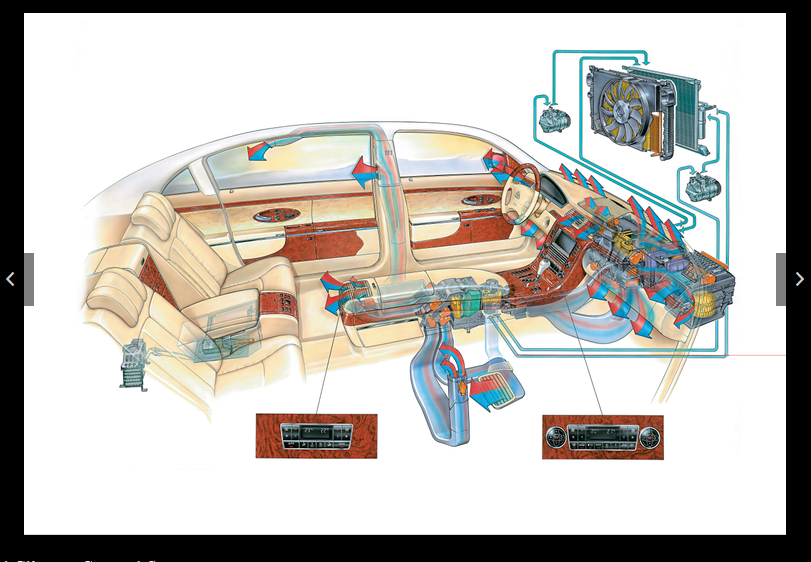
Dual Climate Control

Every Maybach has 2 climate control systems – one for the front compartment and one for the rear. Each can be programmed and operated independently, producing four-zone climate control.

An upgraded version of the Mercedes air suspension system called AirMatic Dual Control is standard, featuring air springs complemented by an additional spring-rate adjustment system with adaptive damping.

Options for the Maybach 62 and 62S include: 18-way power rear seats (replacing 14-way); power side sunshades; cooled rear seats; wireless headphones; electrochromic power panoramic sunroof (replacing power sunroof); steering wheel mounted navigation controls.

The company offered various options for customers to personalize their vehicles, and provided various equipment combinations.

=== Performance ===
The engine in the base Model 57 and 62 is the Mercedes-Benz M285, a 5.5-litre twin-turbo V12 developed specifically for the new Maybach cars. It produces 405 kW (550 PS; 542 hp) at 5250 rpm with 664 lb⋅ft (900 N⋅m) of torque at 2300–3000 rpm. A slightly de-tuned version, denoted M275, was used in the 2003–2006 W220 S600 and CL600 replacing the M137, naturally aspirated V12, which appears in the 1998–2002 W220 S600 and CL600.

The Maybach 57 accelerates from 0 to 60 mph (0 to 97 km/h) in about 5.1 seconds; the Maybach 62 and 57 S, about 4.8 seconds; the Maybach 62 S, 4.5 seconds, and the Landaulet, 4.5 seconds. In terms of power output, the 57 and 62 have 405 kW (550 PS; 542 hp); the 57 S and 62 S, 450 kW (612 PS; 604 hp); and the Zeppelin has 471 kW (640 PS; 631 hp).

=== Price ===
In early 2008, European and United States prices were:

- Maybach 57 – $366,934 / €341,750
- Maybach 57 S – $417,402 / €381,250
- Maybach 62 – $431,055 / €392,750
- Maybach 62 S – $492,602 / €432,250
- Maybach Landaulet – $1,350,000 / €900,000

== Introduction ==
On 26 June 2002 a Maybach 62 enclosed in a glass case on the Queen Elizabeth 2 departed from Southampton, England, en route to New York City, with the media and company officials staying in the luxury suites on board. The ship arrived in New York on 2 July, welcomed by geysering fireboats and a motor boat. A helicopter lifted the car off the liner and onto a dock. It was then driven to the Regent Hotel, Wall Street.

== Variants ==
=== Maybach 57 ===
The Maybach 57 is the base designation. A total of 1,104 units were produced.

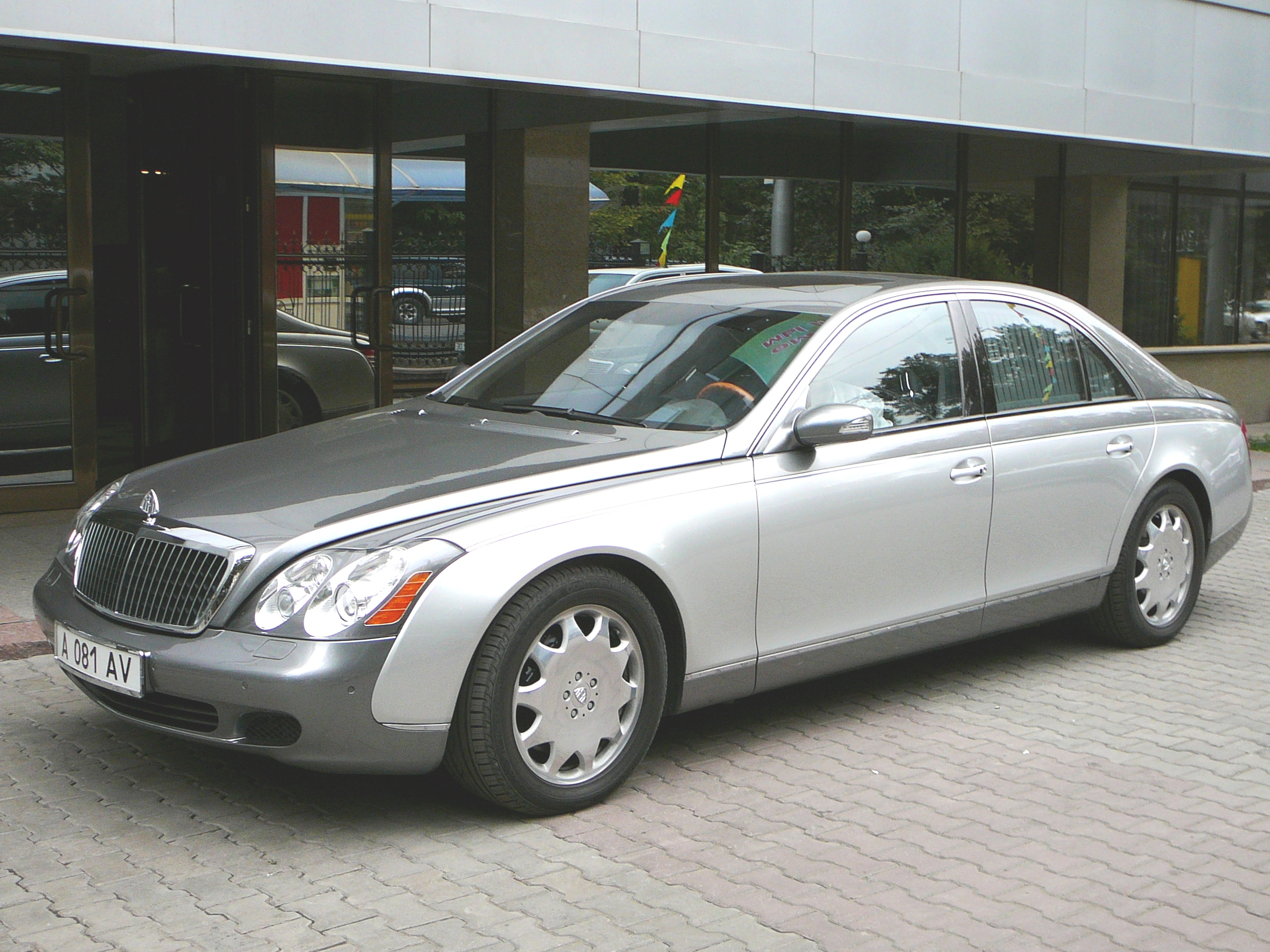
Maybach 57

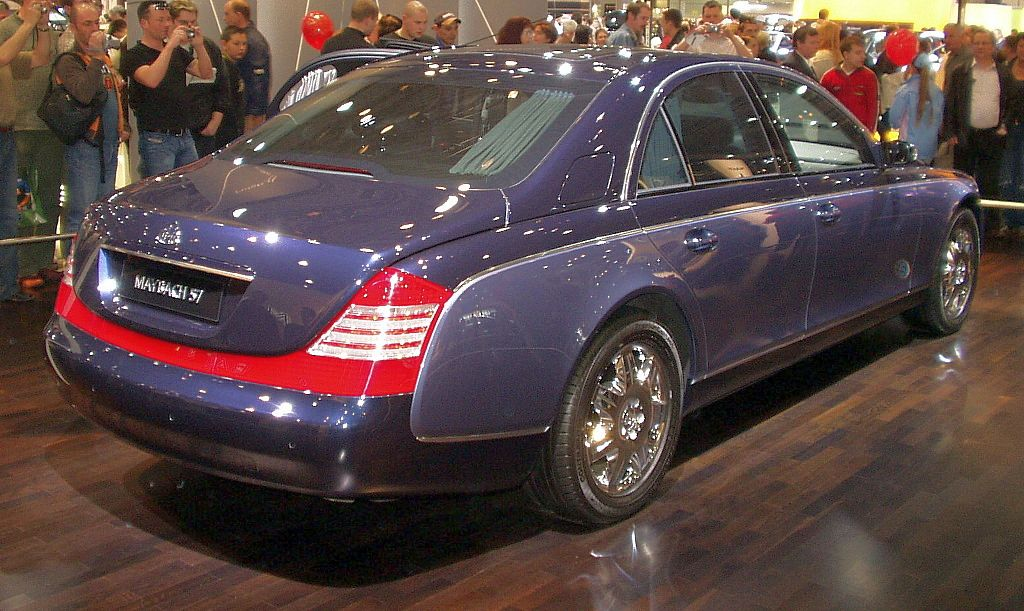
Rear view

=== Maybach 57 S ===
Daimler revealed the Maybach 57 S at the 2005 Geneva Motor Show, with the S standing for Spezial. It uses a 6.0-liter version of the V12 engine manufactured by Mercedes-AMG. Power output is 450 kW (612 PS; 604 hp) and torque 1,000 N⋅m (738 lb⋅ft), providing a sub-five second acceleration to 60 mph (97 km/h). It also rides 0.5 in (13 mm) lower on 20-inch wheels. The North American unveiling was at the Los Angeles Auto Show in January 2006. A total of 503 of the pre-facelift and 164 of the 2010 facelifted version were produced. The facelifted version produced 630 PS (463 kW; 621 hp).

Maybach 57 S, facelifted version

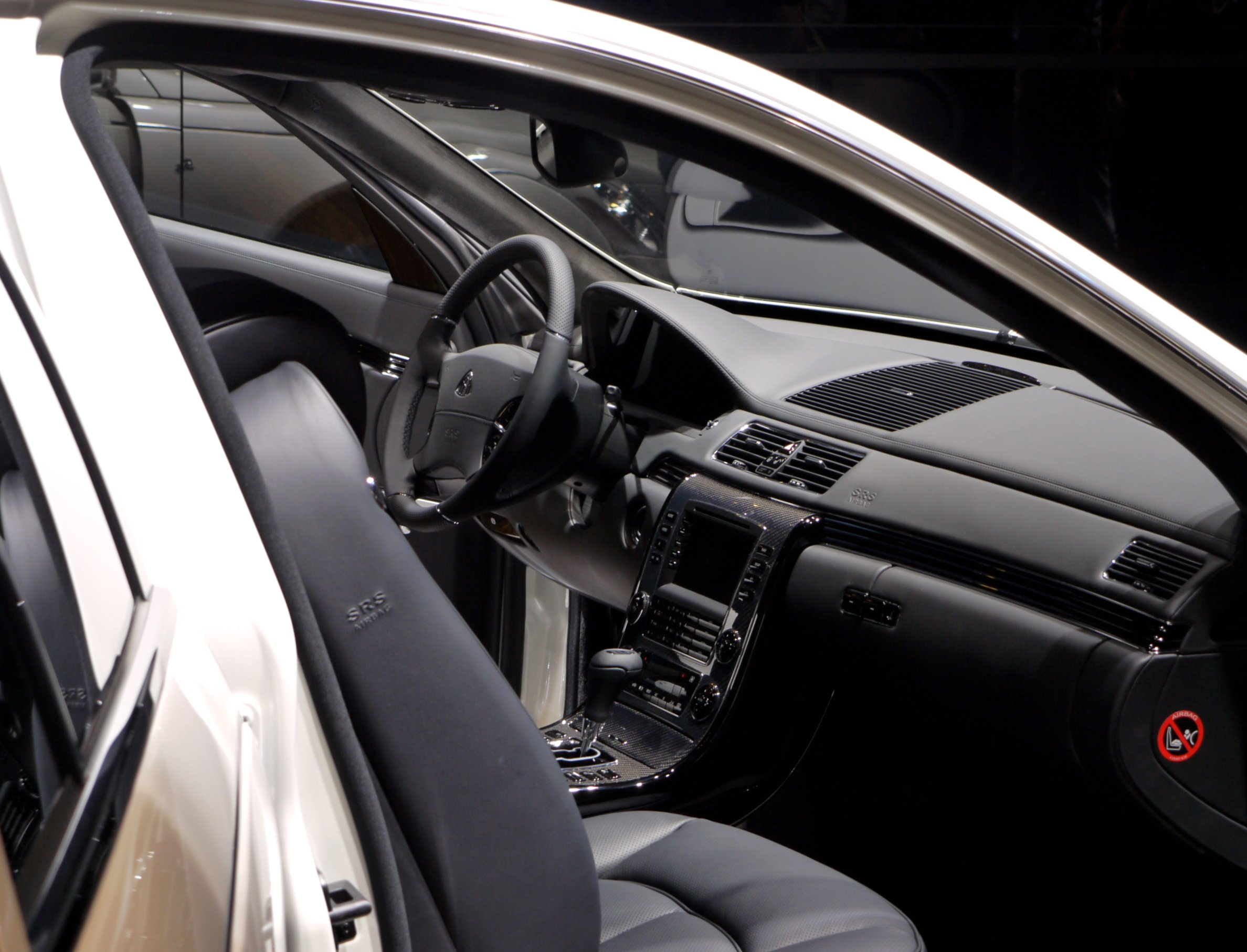
Interior of the front compartment

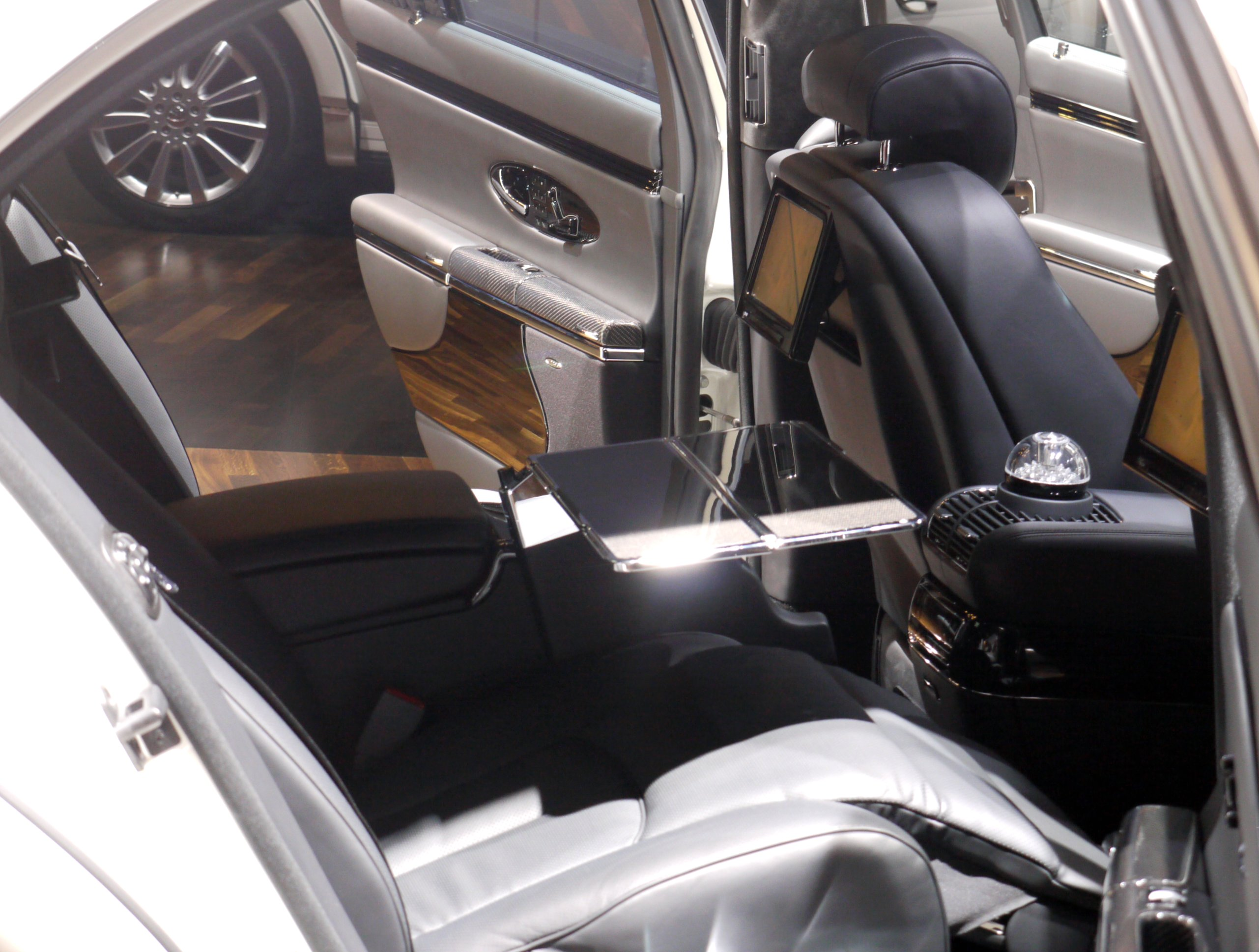
Interior of the rear compartment

=== Maybach 57 and 62 "Zeppelin" ===
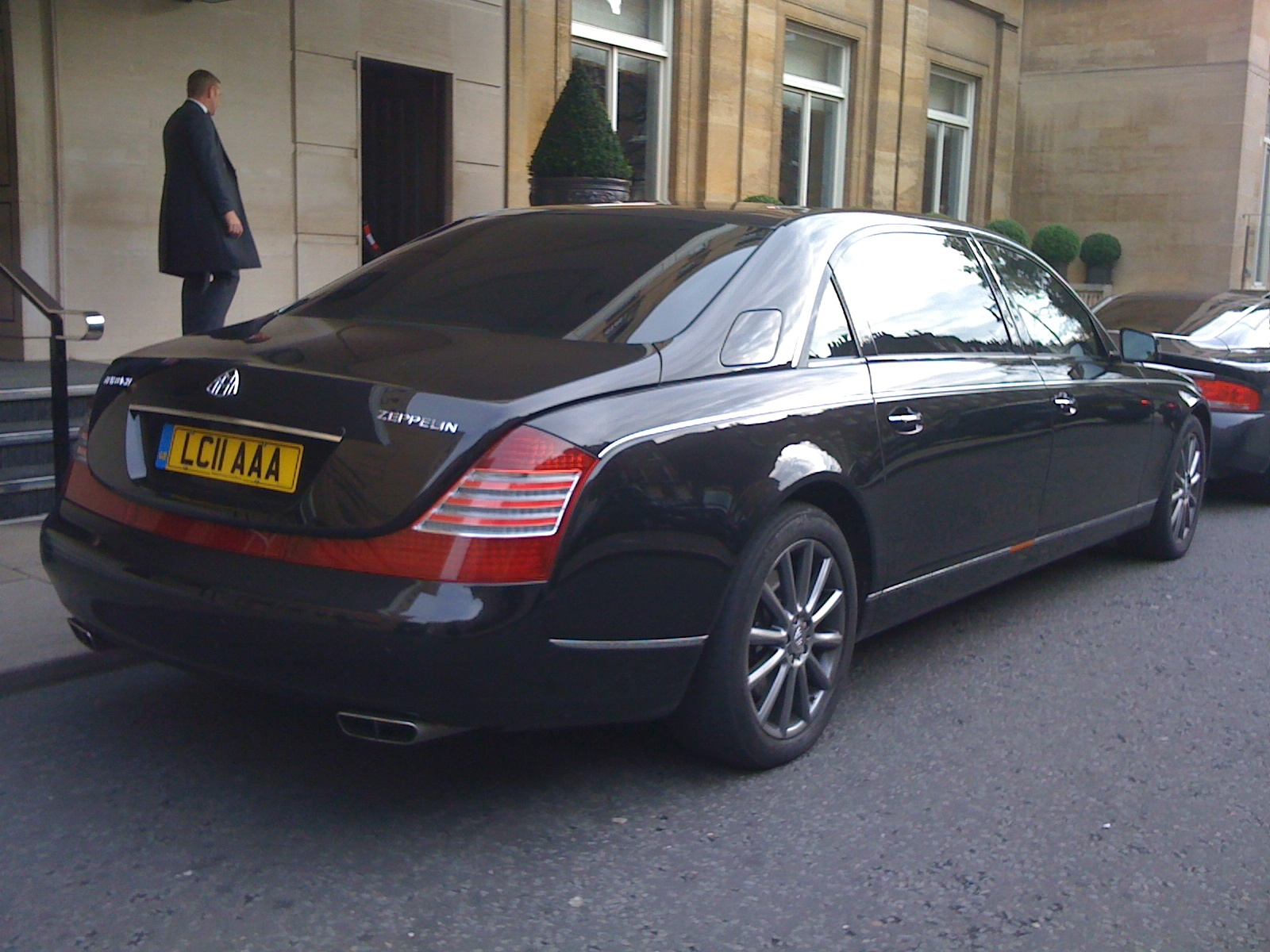
Maybach 62 Zeppelin

Maybach revealed the "Zeppelin" nameplate at the 2009 Geneva Motor Show as an additional luxury package that could be ordered on both the Maybach 57 and 62. The name "Zeppelin" had been used for the pre-war Maybach models DS7 and DS8. A total of 100 units were built.

The package consists of special California beige leather with Stromboli-black stitching, piano black lacquer finishes, and silver "Zeppelin" champagne glasses. In addition to the interior changes, the exterior has exclusive 20-inch chrome wheels and dark-red taillights. The engine is a 6.0-L V12 Twin-Turbo with 471 kW (640 PS; 631 hp), which is 21 kW (28 PS; 28 hp) more than the S versions. The word "ZEPPELIN" is also incorporated into the triangular Maybach hood ornament.

=== Maybach 62 ===
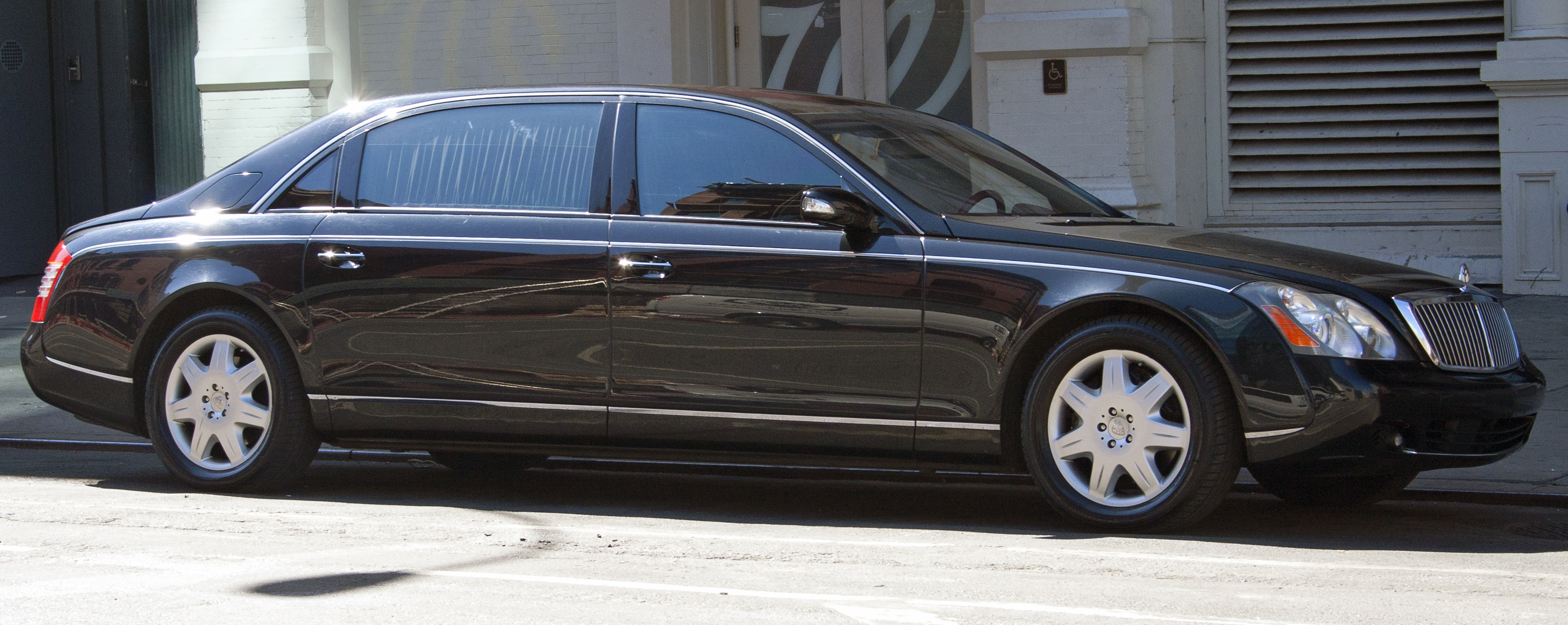

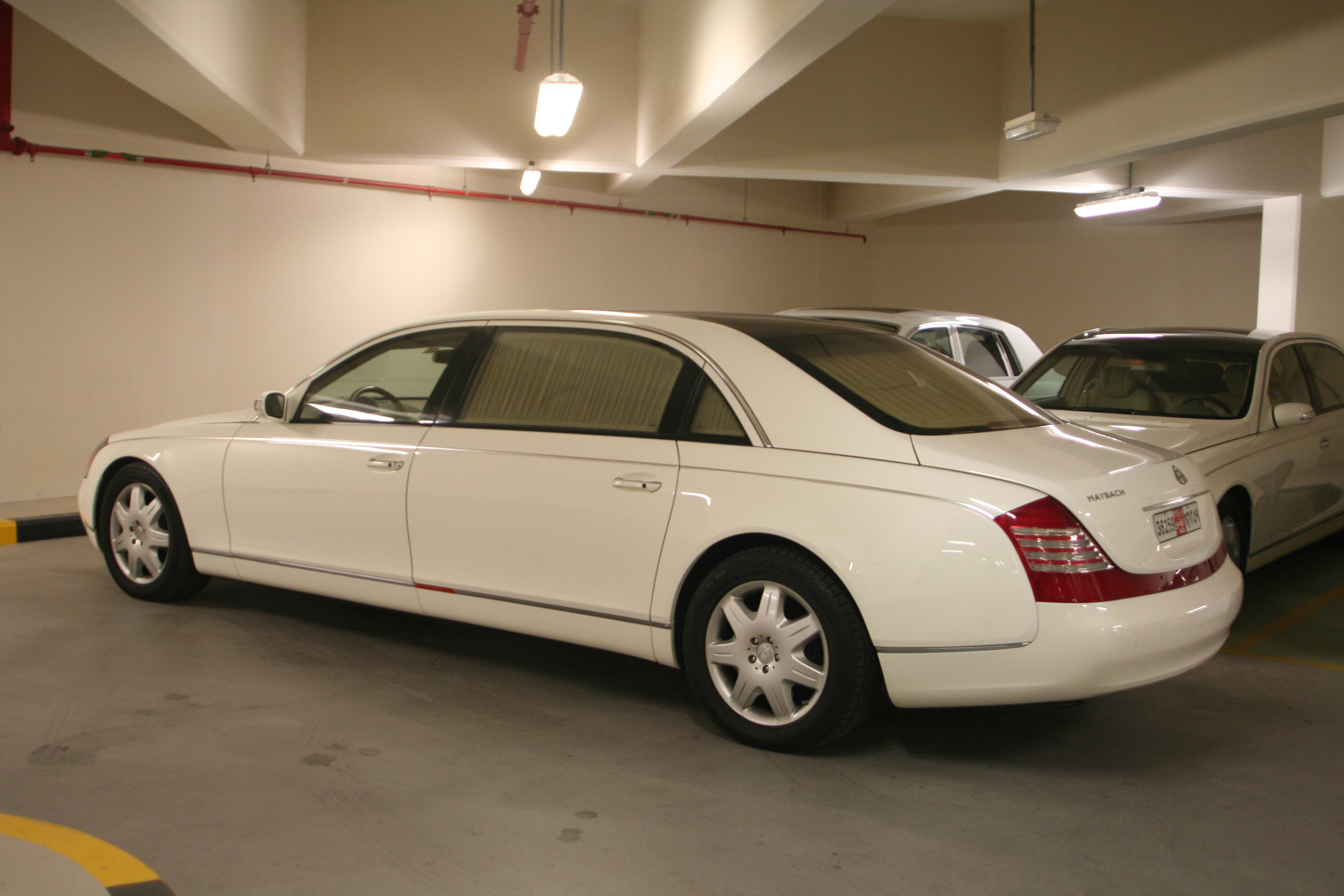
Maybach 62

The Maybach 62 featured as standard fully reclining rear seats, Maybach four-zone climate control, tinted windows, infrared-reflecting laminated glass all round, AirMATIC dual-control air suspension, display instruments in rear roof liner (showing speed, time, and outside temperature), folding rear tables (left and right), 21-speaker Bose Surround Everywhere sound system, and a refrigerator compartment. The Maybach 62 also included an array of additional features such as Cockpit Management and Navigation System (COMAND), containing DVD navigation, CD changer in rear seats, DVD players and TV tuners front and rear, two rear LCD TV screens with remote control and two sets of headphones, and automatic closing doors.

A number of optional extras were also available. These included a panoramic glass sunroof at a cost of $11,670, and an external communication system, and a loudspeaker and microphone system which allows the occupant in the rear of the Maybach to converse with people outside the car. This option came at a cost of $1,780. Additionally, a retractable electrotransparent partition screen between the driver and the rear occupants costs $23,780 and, most expensive, a high-protection GUARD B4 Package costs an additional $151,810. A total of 1,058 units were made.

=== Maybach 62 S ===
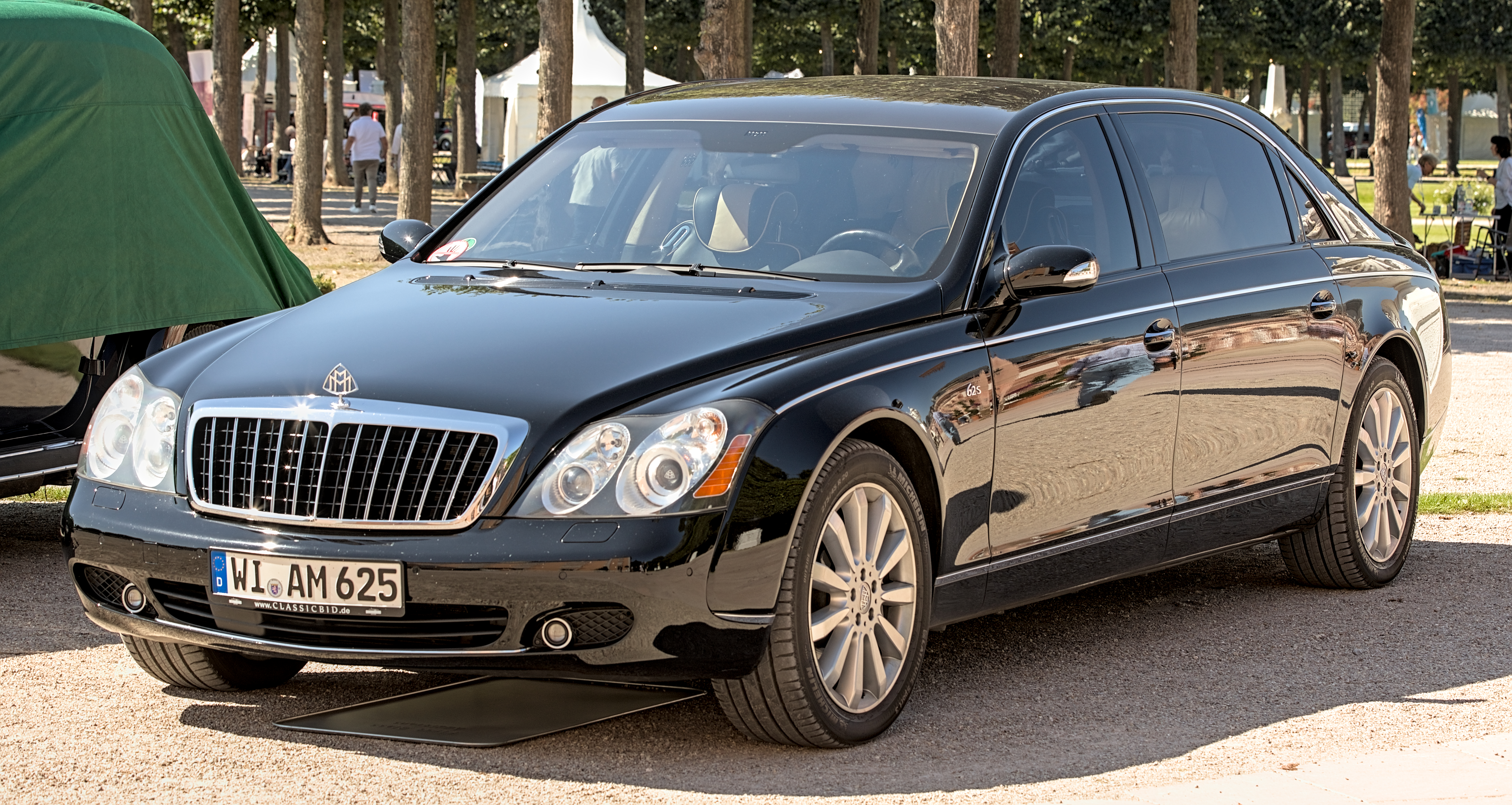
Maybach 62 S

The Maybach 62 S (Spezial) appeared in November 2006 at the Auto China 2006 exhibit in Beijing. It features the same engine as the 57 S, a 612 PS (450 kW; 604 hp) twin-turbo V12 made by Mercedes-Benz AMG, with the facelifted version producing 630 PS (463 kW; 621 hp). However, the suspension remains unchanged. 236 of the original and 256 units of the model year 2010 (post-facelift) were made.

On February 26, 2019, North Korea's chairman Kim Jong-un came to visit Vietnam along with his cars, including a Maybach 62 S and a Mercedes S600 Pullman Guard.

=== Maybach 62 S Landaulet ===
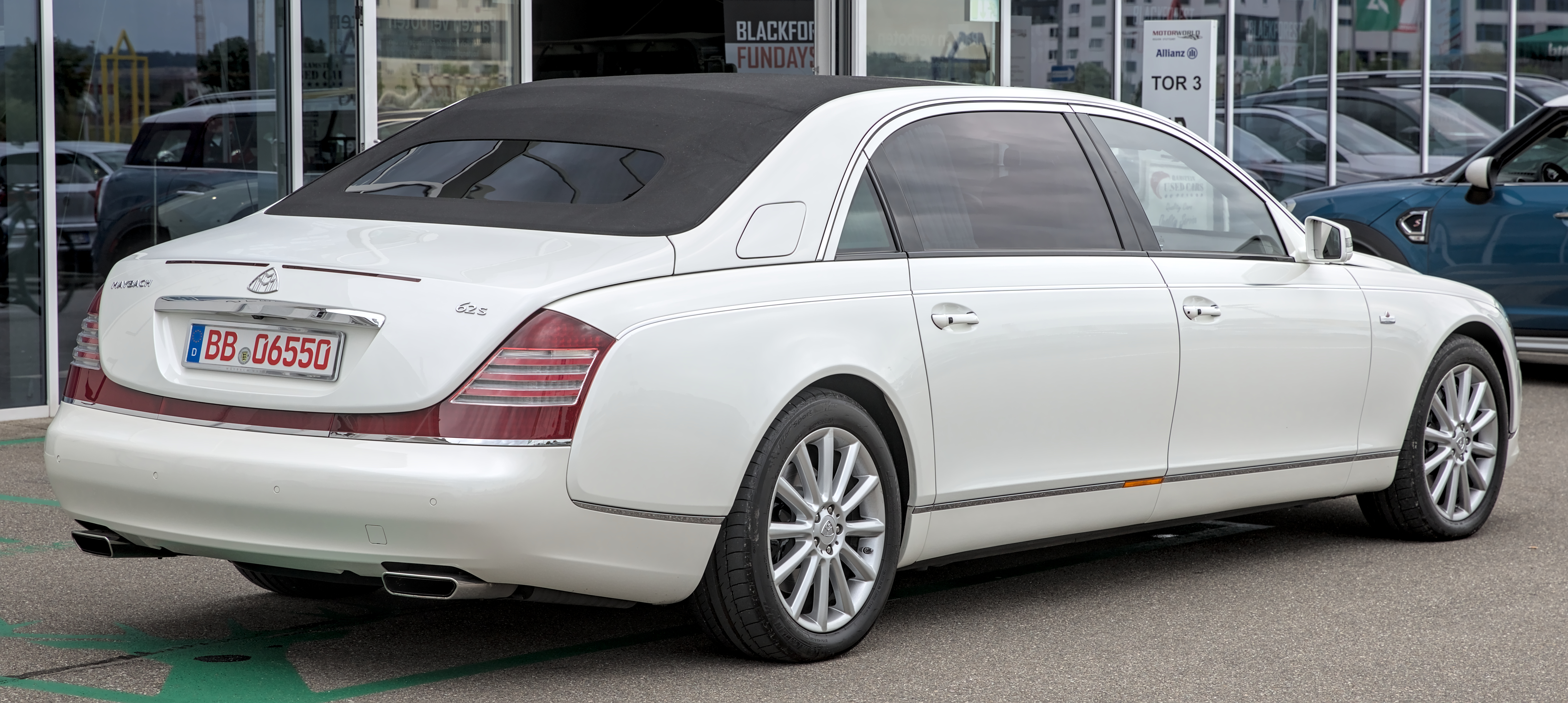
Maybach 62 S Landaulet

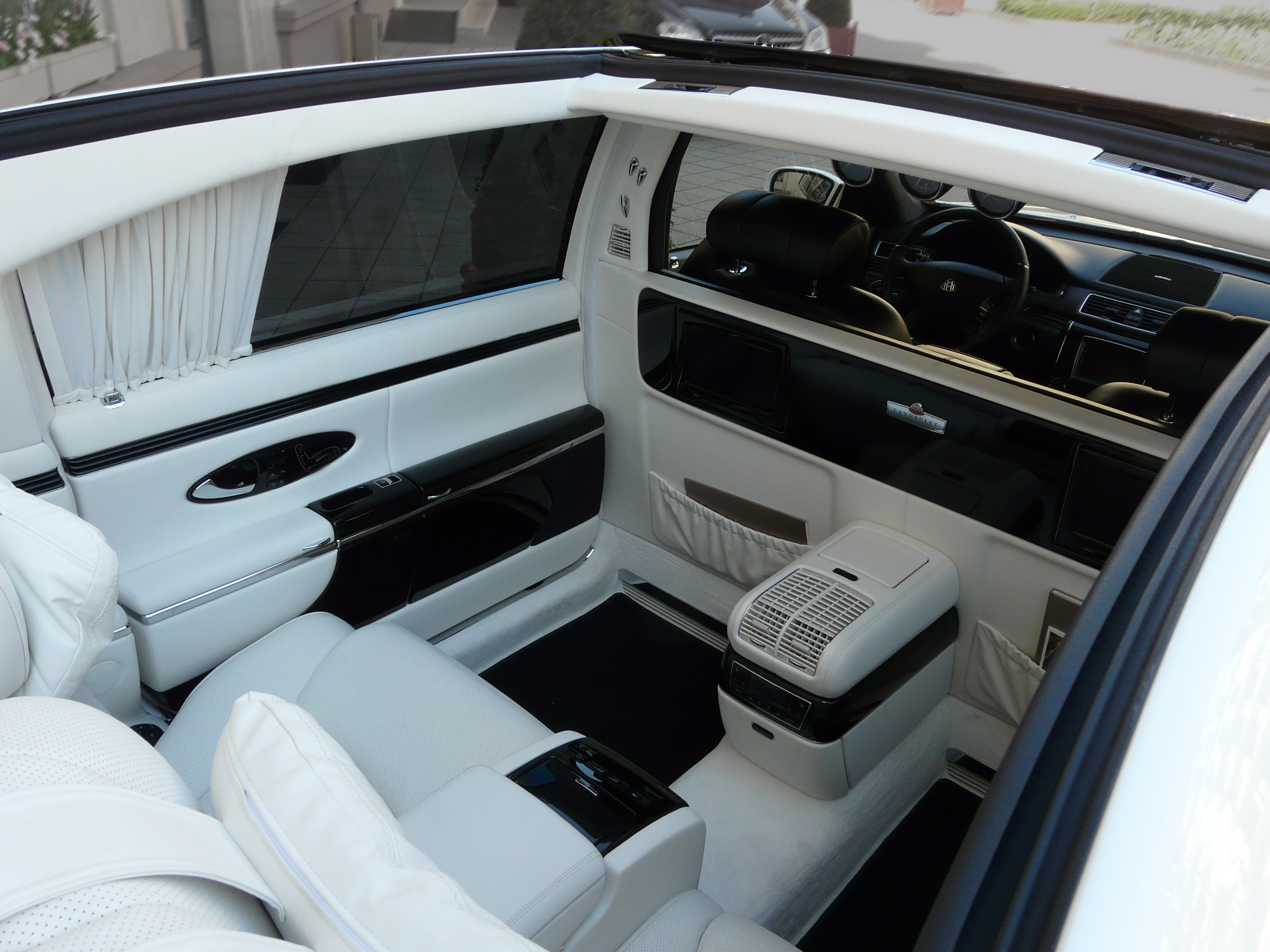
Landaulet rear interior view

The Maybach 62 S Landaulet, based on the Maybach 62 S, revives the classic landaulet car body style, which was most popular in the 1920s and 30s. Powered by the 62 S's 612 PS (450 kW; 604 hp) biturbo V12, the Landaulet's front seats are fully enclosed and separated from the rear passenger compartment by a power divider window; the opacity of this partition can be electronically controlled.

The rear compartment features a power-retractable sliding soft roof. The chauffeur's area is finished in black leather, while the rear is white with piano black- and gold-flecked black granite inserts.

Maybach publicly unveiled the Landaulet at the Middle East International Auto Show around the end of November 2007 as a concept car. Limited production was confirmed in January 2008. In total, 22 units were made, one of which was owned by rapper Birdman. DJ Khaled owns one as well and it has appeared in a few of his music videos. Lee Kun-hee, former chairman of Samsung, also owns one as of 2011.

A total of 18 units of the pre-facelift Maybach 62 S Landaulets were built, with a further four in a facelifted configuration. Ronald Bussink, a Swiss entrepreneur, placed an order for two facelifted Landaulets at the very end of production, in 2011, just when Daimler made the decision to cease production in the following year. Bussink had also changed one of those orders for a one-off RHD model. A special-request 62 S Landaulet "One & only RHD" model was still being completed by a Maybach specialists in January 2013 on a single stand offside while the production line was being dismantled.

=== Maybach 57S Cruisero Coupé by Xenatec ===
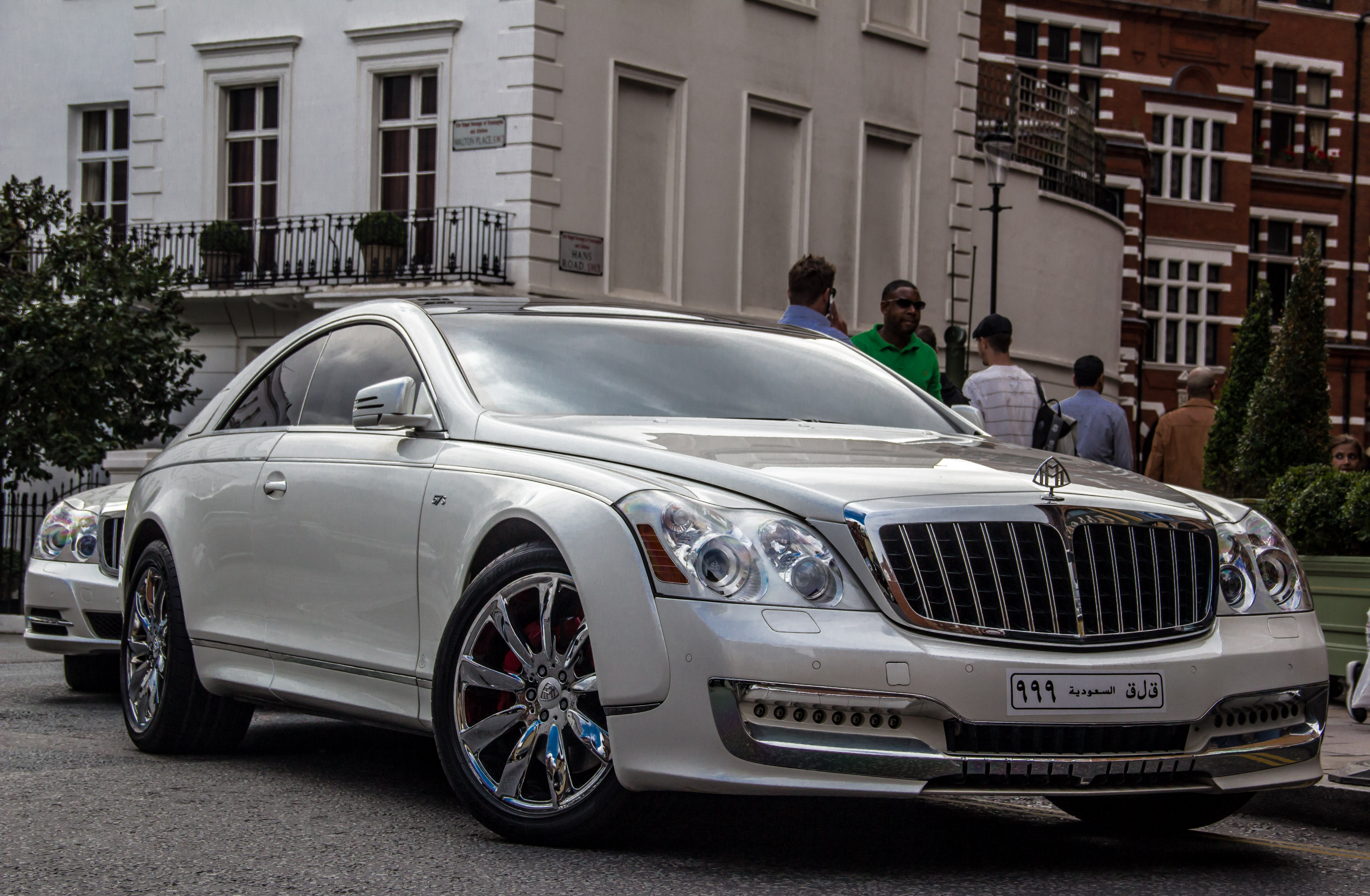
Maybach 57S Cruisero Coupé by Xenatec

In 2010, German coachbuilder Xenatec unveiled the Maybach 57S Cruisero, a 2-door conversion of the Maybach 57S. The Cruisero has the same length, wheelbase, and 6.0-litre V12 engine as the 57S it is based on, making it the longest 2-door that is not from 1970s. It is reported that the car was approved by Daimler and engineered to the same standard as other Maybachs. A total of 8 cars were reportedly produced before Xenatec filed for bankruptcy. Cruisero car number 4 (as seen on the door sill), ordered new by Muammar Gaddafi, was listed for sale in early 2021 in the Netherlands.

== Sales ==
Calendar Year	US Sales	Calendar Year	US Sales
2003	166	2009	66
2004	244	2010	63
2005	152	2011	39
2006	146	2012	50
2007	156	2013	6
2008	119		

Initially, Daimler-Chrysler predicted annual sales of 2,000 global units with 50% coming from the United States; however, such lofty sales expectations never materialized. In 2007, Mercedes bought back 29 US dealers, reducing the total from 71 to 42.

== 2013 cessation ==
With poor sales expectations and heavy impact of 2008 financial crises, Daimler AG undertook a review of the whole Maybach division. This included talks with Aston Martin to engineer and style the next generation of Maybach models along with the next generation of Lagonda models.

However, on 25 November 2011, Daimler announced that sales of all Maybach models and the brand would cease in 2013. Before the announcement, only 3000 Maybach vehicles had been sold, with estimated loss of €330,000 for each car sold. While it was originally planned to produce it into mid-2013, very slow sales convinced Daimler to pull the plug earlier and the last car left the Sindelfingen production line on 17 December 2012. Other sources claim that production ceased in February 2013. A special 62 S Landaulet model was still being completed by January 2013 on a singular stand while the production line was being dismantled.

The line was replaced by Mercedes-Benz S-Class Pullman models. An executive told a Frankfurt newspaper that Daimler "came to the conclusion that the sales chances for the Mercedes brand were better than that of Maybach."

One suggestion for Maybach's struggles was that parent Daimler had failed to differentiate it from its Mercedes-Benz brand. While all three ultra-luxury brands share platforms and engines with other luxury brands from their parent auto company, Maybachs are built alongside the Mercedes-Benz S-Class flagship sedan, whereas Rolls-Royce and Bentley are assembled in England (separate from the rest of BMW and Volkswagen Group's production plants), and thus are regarded as being more "exclusive". Furthermore, the Maybach's pedigree was virtually unknown outside Germany, unlike its British rivals which have long enjoyed renown worldwide; indeed the 2006 Rolls-Royce Phantom's interior evokes memories of a 1930s car, while the Maybach 57S's inside makes no reference to its brand's history.

In October 2013, Top Gear magazine placed the Maybach 57 and 62 on its list of "The 13 worst cars of the last 20 years", commenting that "Mercedes-Benz decided to reactivate a brand that nobody under the age of 90 outside Stuttgart remembered, slathering an ersatz reject Hyundai luxury body over an ageing S-Class platform and hoping that various oligarchs, rap stars and Paris Hilton wouldn't notice that it was actually an elaborate con. They didn't. But we did. The 57S version finally gave the hapless guy up front something to do other than stirring up revolutionary resentment towards his boss, but by the time the Landaulet appeared, the game was up, and Mercedes iced the brand in favour of six different versions of the new S-Class. Smart move. Rolls-Royce, meanwhile, is on course for a record year in 2013."

In 2009, a 2004 Maybach 62 in Germany reached 999,999 kilometres with its original owner.
