= 57th Ordnance Brigade =

57th Ordnance Brigade (Ammo)
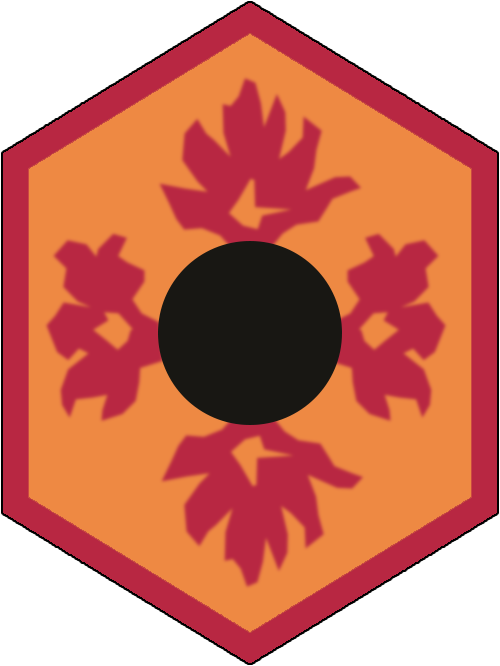
- Active: 1965-1992
- Country: United States
- Allegiance: 7th Army
- Branch: US Army
- Type: Ordnance
- Size: Brigade
- Garrison/HQ: Kaiserslautern, West Germany
- Motto: V For Victory

Insignia
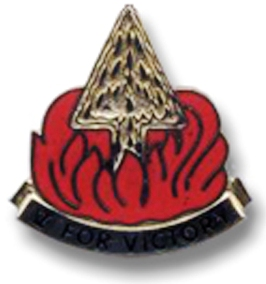
- 57th Ordnance Brigade DUI

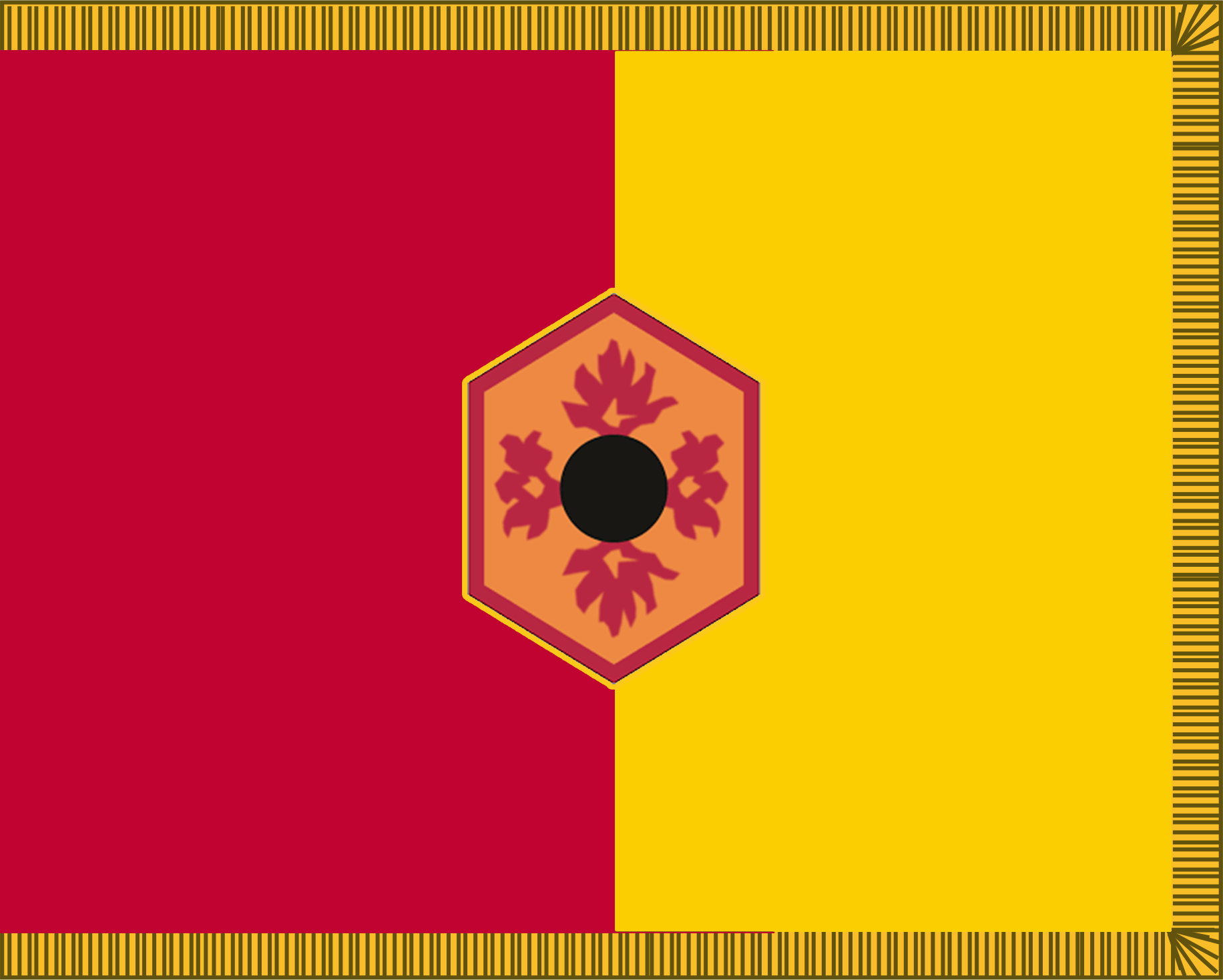
- 57th Ordnance Brigade Flag

The 57th Ordnance Brigade was a unit of the US Army in Europe stationed at Rhine Ordinance Barracks, Kaiserslautern, West Germany beginning in 1965 when it was redesignated from the 57th Ordnance Group. The Brigade was responsible for the ammunition supply to the entire Seventh Army. The Brigade was deactivated with its sister brigade, the 59th Ordnance Brigade in 1992.

== Subordinate Units June 1966 ==
HHC, 57th Ordnance Brigade (Ammo)	Rhine Ordnance Barracks, Kaiserslautern
15th Ordnance Battalion (Ammo)	Gutleut Kaserne, Frankfurt
84th Ordnance Battalion (Ammo)	Rhine Ordnance Barracks , Kaiserslautern
101st Ordnance Battalion (Ammo)	Badenerhof Kaserne, Heilbronn
23rd Ordnance Co (Ammo)	Badenerhof Kaserne, Heilbronn
28th Ordnance Co (Ammo)	Kreuzberg Kaserne, Zweibrücken
Det	Münster Kaserne, Münster
50th Ordnance Ammo Co (Ammo)	Dolan Barracks , Schw. Hall
144th Ordnance Ammo Co (Ammo)	Ray Barracks , Friedberg
Det	Wildflecken Training Area
184th Ordnance Ammo Co (Ammo)	Pulaski Barracks , Kaiserslautern
Det	North Point, Kriegsfeld
501st Ordnance Ammo Co (Ammo)	Gerszewski Barracks , Karlsruhe
Det	Husterhoeh Kaserne, Pirmasens
535th Ordnance Ammo Co (Ammo)	Nainhof Kaserne, Hohenfels
Det	Rose Barracks , Vilseck
545th Ordnance Ammo Co (Ammo)	Münster Kaserne, Münster
663rd Ordnance Ammo Co (Ammo)	Rose Barracks , Vilseck
664th Ordnance Ammo Co (Ammo)	Strassburg Kaserne, Idar-Oberstein
2nd Ordnance Det (EOD)	Graf Post, Grafenwöhr
636th Ordnance Det (Ammo)	North Point, Kriegsfeld
2040th LS Ammo Co	LS Kaserne, Darmstadt
2041st LS Ammo Co	Lüttich Kaserne, Mannheim
