= 57th Indian Brigade =

3rd Quetta Brigade 57th Indian Brigade
- Active: April 1918 –
- Country: British India
- Allegiance: British Crown
- Branch: British Indian Army
- Type: Infantry
- Size: Brigade
- Part of: 4th (Quetta) Division
- Engagements: First World War Third Anglo-Afghan War

The 57th Indian Brigade (originally 3rd Quetta Brigade) was an infantry brigade of the British Indian Army that was active in the Indian Army during the First World War and took part in the Third Anglo-Afghan War in 1919. It was not reformed for the Second World War.

== History ==
Throughout the First World War, the 4th (Quetta) Division had remained in India. It performed internal security duties and guarded the borders with Afghanistan and Persia, notably by maintaining the East Persia Cordon to suppress arms trafficking. It was mobilized several times for Frontier service.

The 3rd Quetta Brigade was formed at Quetta in April 1918 under 4th (Quetta) Division. In July 1918 it was numbered as the 57th Indian Brigade. The brigade was mobilised in May 1919 with the division and took part in the Third Anglo-Afghan War.

== Order of battle ==
The brigade had the following composition:

- 1/4th Battalion, Queen's Own (Royal West Kent Regiment) (arrived at Quetta in February 1918 from Jubbulpore Brigade, 5th (Mhow) Division and joined the brigade on formation)
- 1st Battalion, 127th Queen Mary's Own Baluch Light Infantry (arrived at Quetta in March 1918 from East Africa and joined the brigade on formation; left for Bushire in September 1918)
- 1st Battalion, 129th Duke of Connaught's Own Baluchis (arrived at Karachi in January 1918 from East Africa and joined the brigade in April 1918)
- 2nd Battalion, 119th Infantry (The Mooltan Regiment) (arrived at Karachi in March 1918 from Jubbulpore Brigade, 5th (Mhow) Division and joined the brigade in August 1918)
- 3rd Battalion, 7th Gurkha Rifles (joined from Loralai in December 1918)

In May 1919, the brigade mobilised for the war with Afghanistan with the following units:

- 1/4th Battalion, Queen's Own (Royal West Kent Regiment)
- 2nd Battalion, 119th Infantry (The Mooltan Regiment)
- 1st Battalion, 129th Duke of Connaught's Own Baluchis
- 3rd Battalion, 7th Gurkha Rifles

== Commanders ==
The brigade had the following commanders:

From	Rank	Name
12 April 1918	Brigadier-General	M.D. Goring-Jones
16 October 1918	Brigadier-General	J.L.R. Gordon

== Bibliography ==
- Kempton, Chris (2003). 'Loyalty & Honour', The Indian Army September 1939 – August 1947. Vol. Part II Brigades. Milton Keynes: The Military Press. ISBN 0-85420-238-2.
- Perry, F.W. (1993). Order of Battle of Divisions Part 5B. Indian Army Divisions. Newport: Ray Westlake Military Books. ISBN 1-871167-23-X.
