= 2nd Garrison Division of Lanzhou Military Region =

Independent Division of Shaanxi Provincial Military District (1966-69) Independent Division of Gansu Provincial Military District (1969–81) 2nd Garrison Division of Lanzhou Military Region (1981-85)
- Active: 1966.7 - 1985.9
- Country: People's Republic of China
- Branch: People's Liberation Army
- Type: Division
- Role: Infantry, Garrison

Independent Division of Shaanxi Provincial Military District (Chinese: 陕西省军区独立师)(1st Formation) was formed in 1966 from the Public Security Contingent of Shaanxi province. The division was composed of five regiments (1st to 5th) and two independent battalions.

On April 18, 1969 it exchanged its position and designation with Independent Division of Gansu Provincial Military District and became the second formation of Independent Division of Gansu Provincial Military District(Chinese: 甘肃省军区独立师) with 3 of its regiments (1st to 3rd). 4th Regiment and 5th Regiment was detached from the division. On the division's arrival, former 6th Regiment of Independent Division of Qinghai Provincial Military District joined the division and became its 4th Regiment.

In April 1971, the 5th Regiment was activated from 1st Independent Infantry Regiment of Gansu Provincial Military District. In May 1971, the 6th Regiment was activated. By then the division was composed of 10341 personnel.

In April 1976 the division was re-organized:

- Its 1st, 2nd and 6th Regiments were renamed as 1st, 2nd and 3rd Regiments;
- Its 3rd, 4th and 5th Regiments were detached from the division and renamed as 1st, 2nd and 3rd Independent Infantry Regiments of Gansu Provincial Military District.
- Independent Cavalry Regiment of Gansu Provincial Military District was attached and converted to Artillery Regiment.

The division reduced to about 5000 personnel during the re-organization. Soon it moved to Jingtai County, Gansu Province.

In 1979 the division was expanded to 7000 personnel. Engineer Battalion, Communication Battalion, Antiaircraft Artillery Battalion and NBC Defense Company were activated.

In January 1981 the division was re-organized and renamed as 2nd Garrison Division of Lanzhou Military Region(Chinese: 兰州军区守备第2师) and reduced to 6500 personnel.

In September 1985 the division was disbanded.
