= 57th Rifle Division (Soviet Union) =

57th Rifle Division (1946–1947) 57th Motor Rifle Division (1940–1946) 57th Rifle Division (1921–1940)
- Active: 1921–1947
- Country: Soviet Union
- Branch: Red Army (Soviet Army from 1946) (Note: The Red Army was officially redesignated as the Soviet Army on 25 February 1946; the term Soviet Army had been used interchangeably to refer to the former in Western sources.)
- Type: Infantry (Motorized Infantry 1940–1946)
- Size: Division
- Engagements: Russian Civil War; Battles of Khalkhin Gol; Soviet invasion of Manchuria (part of World War II)
- Decorations: Order of the Red Banner
- Battle honours: Yekaterinburg (replaced); Ural; Khingan

Commanders
- Notable commanders: Ivan Galanin

The 57th Red Banner Ural-Khingan Rifle Division (Russian: 57-я стрелковая дивизия) was an infantry division of the Red Army and the Soviet Army.

The division was originally formed in late 1920 as the 24th Rifle Division of the Internal Service Troops (VNUS) in the closing stages of the Russian Civil War. It was transferred to the Red Army in early 1921 as the 57th Rifle Division. The division served in the Urals as a territorial division during the 1920s and early 1930s. Transferred to the Transbaikal in 1932, it fought in the Battles of Khalkhin Gol in mid-1939 and was reorganized as the 57th Red Banner Motor Rifle Division (Russian: 57-я Краснознаменная мотострелковая дивизия) in 1940. Having spent much of World War II on garrison duty in the Mongolian People's Republic, the division participated in the August 1945 Soviet invasion of Manchuria, but did not see combat. It was converted into a rifle division again in 1946, before being reduced to the 55th Separate Rifle Regiment in early 1947.

== Russian Civil War and Interwar period ==
The 24th Rifle Division of the Internal Service Troops (VNUS) was formed in accordance with an order of the Ural Military District VNUS on 25 October 1920 from VNUS units deployed in Vyatka, Yekaterinburg, and Perm Governorates. It was subordinated to the Ural Military District VNUS, and included the 69th, 70th, and 71st VNUS Brigades. Between February and April 1921, separate units of the division fought in the suppression of the West Siberian revolt, a series of anti-Soviet peasant uprisings in the area of Tyumen, Ishim, and Petropavlovsk.

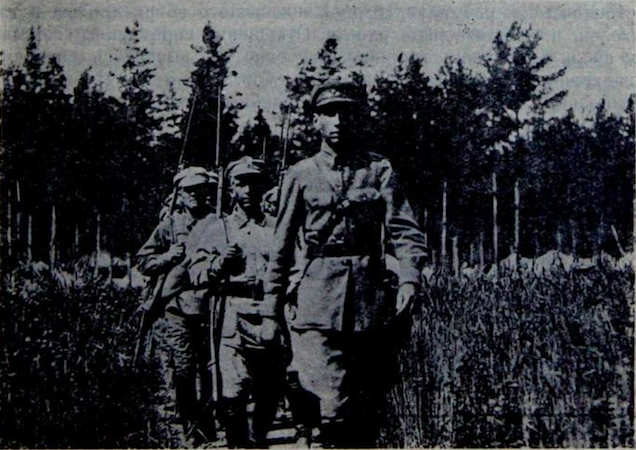
Territorial soldiers of the division's 170th Regiment on the march during a 1927 summer encampment

Following the transfer of VNUS troops to the Red Army on 4 March, the division was redesignated as the 57th Rifle Division of Field Troops by an 18 March order of the Ural Military District. This subordinated it to the Ural Military District. On 30 November, the division became the 57th Yekaterinburg Rifle Division. The division included the 112th, 113th and 114th Rifle Regiments, which were later renumbered as the 169th, 170th, and 171st. In June 1922, the division transferred to the West Siberian Military District when the Ural Military District was disbanded. Between 1922 and August 1923 the 57th was commanded by Ivan Onufriyev. It became part of the Volga Military District in February 1923. On 12 June 1924, its Yekaterinburg honorific was replaced by the Ural honorific. Between 1924 and March 1932, the division was a reduced strength territorial division. It was commanded by Nikolay Uvarov between October 1924 and 1928, Viktor Dobrovolsky between July 1928 and July 1930, and by Yevgeny Danenberg from February 1931 to August 1935. In June 1931, the division provided a cadre for the formation of the 85th Rifle Division.

In early March 1932, the division was transferred to the Soviet Far East and became part of the Transbaikal Group of Forces, part of the Special Red Banner Far Eastern Army. A cadre from the 169th Regiment was left behind to form the replacement 82nd Territorial Rifle Division. It was stationed at Olovyannaya, except for the 170th Regiment at Sretensk. In June 1935, the Transbaikal Group of Forces was split from the army to become the Transbaikal Military District. In the late 1930s, its regiments were renumbered in an attempt to confuse foreign intelligence: the 169th Perm became the 80th, the 170th Sverdlovsk the 127th, the 171st Chelyabinsk the 293rd, and the 57th Ural Artillery the 105th. Komdiv Vyacheslav Tsvetayev took command of the division in February 1937. He was arrested in July 1938 during the Great Purge, charged with "counter-revolutionary activities" after the wounding of eleven soldiers by the explosion of an artillery shell during the division's 1938 May Day parade. In August, Colonel Ivan Galanin took command of the division.

== Khalkhin Gol ==
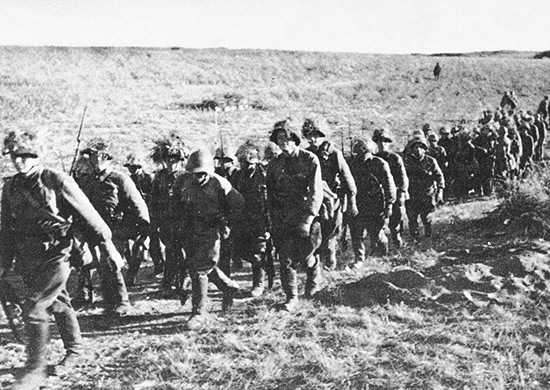
Soviet troops marching towards Khalkhin Gol

As a result of a series of border clashes with Japanese troops at Khalkhin Gol, the division was alerted for combat on 29 June 1939. Simultaneously, a large number of its officers and vehicles were taken from its units to reinforce units already involved in the fighting. The division was loaded into echelons to be sent to the front, ostensibly for a training exercise, arriving in the second echelon on 5 August. From then until 18 August the 57th spent between 10 and 12 hours a day in intense training, preparing for combat. The 57th became part of the 1st Army Group, commanded by Komkor Georgy Zhukov. Under Zhukov's plan, the division formed part of the southern group of the 1st Army Group, which was to encircle the Japanese troops in tandem with the northern group by destroying the Japanese troops north of the Holsten River, then attack towards Nomonhan. The southern group also included the entire 6th Light Tank Brigade and the majority of the 8th Armored Motor and 11th Light Tank Brigades. On the 57th's left was the 82nd Rifle Division of the central group. For the attack, the division was supported by an anti-tank battalion in addition to its organic field artillery and howitzer regiments.

By 20 August, it fielded 11,861 men, 10,310 rifles, 115 DP machine guns, 179 Maxim guns, 21 anti-aircraft machine guns, seven 12.7 mm DShK heavy machine guns, eight mortars, 86 grenade launchers, 36 76 mm regimental guns, 40 guns with calibers between 76 mm and 152 mm, four 76 mm anti-aircraft guns, 33 45 mm anti-tank guns, 14 tanks, and 15 armored cars. On 20 August, the division attacked from positions south and southeast of Noro Heights with the 293rd Regiment on the left and the 127th Regiment on the right. The 127th broke through the defenses of the Japanese 23rd Division's 71st Infantry Regiment to the northeast towards Height 757, while the 293rd destroyed the Japanese covering units and advanced to the forward line of the main Japanese position, but was unsuccessful in its attempts to capture it. The 80th Regiment advanced in the second wave on the 127th's right, reaching the fringe of its objective, the sector of Heights 780 and 791 (known in Russian as the Great Sands) by 19:00. Negligible Japanese forces were left in the gap between the 80th and 127th Regiments. The 57th advanced about 12 kilometers (7.5 mi) during the day, the largest advance of any Soviet unit for 20 August.

On 21 August, the division's reconnaissance battalion was used to fill the 4-kilometer (2.5 mi) gap that had opened between the 80th and 127th Regiments, advancing to the left of the group's armored units. On the next day, the troops of the division isolated and eliminated Japanese strongpoints, destroying bunkers with the aid of flamethrower tanks. Exceptionally strong resistance was encountered at two positions about 5 kilometers (3.1 mi) south of the Holsten, which was suppressed with the assistance of the flamethrower tanks. By the end of the 23 August, the entire Japanese line had been unhinged in the group's sector.

On 24 August, two Japanese infantry regiments with air support launched a counterattack to divert Soviet troops away from the encirclement southeast of Nomonhan. The division's 80th Rifle Regiment, along with the 6th Tank Brigade and an additional rifle regiment, was tasked with stopping the counterattack. They succeeded, while suffering casualties of 285 killed and wounded, as well as losing four tanks during the day. On 26 August it was ordered to attack the Japanese force in the flank. After the northern group reduced the Japanese strongpoints in its sector, the division's 127th and 293rd Regiments were tasked with mopping up the last major Japanese resistance, concentrated in fortified heights in the center. At 11:00 on 27 August, a battalion-sized Japanese group, with 75-millimeter (3.0 in) cannon and heavy machine guns, attempted to escape the encirclement, but was destroyed by the division. By the end of the day, the 57th had eliminated Japanese resistance south of the Holsten and secured the area, with the 127th Regiment crossing to the river's northern bank. On 28 August, the commander of the 127th Regiment, Major Nikolay Grukhin, was killed in action; he was posthumously made a Hero of the Soviet Union on 17 November. The mopping up was completed by 31 August, when the last Japanese troops were pushed back over the border claimed by Mongolia.

After organizing the defense of the claimed border, the 80th Regiment repulsed a 4 September attack by a Japanese force numbering up to a battalion in strength against its positions on the height of Eris-Ulin-Obo, killing six and capturing two. Two Japanese battalions surrounded and encircled a company of the 82nd Division's 603rd Rifle Regiment on 8 September; a counterattack launched by the latter and supported by artillery and the 57th's reconnaissance and tank battalions surrounded and destroyed the Japanese force by the morning of 9 September. The battle was officially ended by a Soviet-Mongolian-Japanese agreement signed in Moscow on 15 September, which declared a ceasefire that took effect on 16 September. The division suffered 836 casualties during the battle. After the end of the battle, the division was stationed at Khamar-Daba, then at Tamsagbulag in the Mongolian People's Republic. On 17 November, the division and its 127th and 293rd Rifle Regiments were awarded the Order of the Red Banner for their actions at Khalkhin Gol.

== World War II ==
=== Garrison duty in Mongolia ===
By an order of 19 March 1940, the division was reorganized as the 57th Motor Rifle Division. Around the same time, the 234th Howitzer Artillery Regiment was disbanded. As a motor rifle division, it included the 80th, 127th, and 293rd Motor Rifle Regiments, and the 105th Artillery Regiment. After Galanin was sent west to command a rifle corps in June, Colonel Dmitry Samarsky took command in July. In July, the 57th became part of the Transbaikal District's newly formed 17th Army. On 1 November, it fielded 11,957 men with 19 anti-aircraft machine guns, seventy-one 45 mm guns, thirty-four 76 mm guns, twenty-four 122 mm guns, twelve 152 mm guns, two BT tanks, five T-26 tanks, nine other tanks, and 753 trucks, among other equipment.

Following the beginning of Operation Barbarossa, the German invasion of the Soviet Union, on 22 June 1941, the division remained with the 17th Army in Mongolia. It sent reinforcements to the front during the war. Samarsky was sent to the Eastern Front to become chief of staff of a field army in February 1942. He was replaced by the chief of the 17th Army cadre department, Colonel Ivan Khokhlov. Colonel Viktor Nikiforov (promoted to Major General 16 October 1943) took command of the division in July 1943, after Khokhlov was sent to study at the Higher Military Academy. In September, the 57th was subordinated to the newly formed 85th Rifle Corps of the army. Nikiforov was promoted to command the corps in April 1944, and was replaced by division deputy commander Lieutenant Colonel Nurey Zakirov, who was promoted to colonel on 10 August 1944.

=== Soviet invasion of Manchuria ===
For the Soviet invasion of Manchuria, the division became part of the newly arrived 6th Guards Tank Army on 17 July 1945. The 127th Regiment handed over its border positions in the Khamar-Daba area to troops from the 39th Army on 19 July and camped on the eastern outskirts of Tamsagbulag. Three companies from the regiment were detached to protect airfields. On 21 July, it was subordinated to the commander of the army's 9th Guards Mechanized Corps. During this period, the division conducted training and was brought up to full readiness in weapons, ammunition, equipment, and vehicles. Officers surveyed the jumping off positions for the attack, while the division's units were alerted for combat. On 28 July, the corps ordered the division to move to new positions near wells 5 kilometers (3.1 mi) northeast of Lake Khala-Gaita-nur. At 15:00 on 28 July the division began the 45-kilometer (28 mi) march via two routes and by 8:00 on 30 July had reached the new positions. There, the 1st and 2nd Separate Tank Battalions with BT-7 light tanks were operationally subordinated to the division.

On 5 August, to prepare the jumping off positions, the advanced battalions of the three motor rifle regiments were withdrawn from Heights 935 and 941.1 on the Manchurian border. On the night of 7 to 8 August, elements of the division made a night march from the area of Height 752, 2.5 kilometers (1.6 mi) north of the jumping off positions, and by the morning of 8 August had reached the jumping off positions.

The invasion began on 9 August; the operations that the division participated in became known in Soviet historiography as the Khingan–Mukden Offensive. The division took two routes across the border, led by a reinforced forward detachment on each route. The first forward detachment, advancing along the rightward route from Heights 938 and 952, Ikhe-Sume, Toyromo-Pomunur, and the western outskirts of Bayan-Khoshun-Sume, included the 80th Regiment, supported by the 3rd Battalion of the 105th Artillery. By the end of the first day of the invasion, the first detachment was to reach a line on the south coast of Lake Surin-nur and Tametyamuso while covering the advance of the main forces of the division at Bayan-Khoshun-Sume. The second forward detachment, advancing along the leftward route from Heights 951, 877, 781, and 776, Senpokandzieru, and Pakasunur, included the 127th Regiment, supported by the 2nd Battalion of the 105th. By the end of the day, it was to advance to the line of Tametyamuso and Arakhorutok, covering the advance of the division's main forces. The advance detachments crossed the border at 00:05 on 9 August.

The main force consisted of the 293rd Regiment, the 1st Battalion of the 105th, the division headquarters, and support units. It advanced on the leftward route and was tasked with capturing Bayan-Khoshun-Sume by the end of the day, crossing the border at 04:30. By the end of 9 August, the division's advance detachments and main force units had entered Bayan-Khoshun-Sume after a 145-kilometer (90 mi) march, although the 293rd took two more days to reach the settlement. On 10 August, units of the division continued their march into the foothills of the Greater Khingan mountains, in difficult conditions via 50–60 kilometers (31–37 mi) of sandy roads with no water sources. On 12 August, units of the division, crossing the Greater Khingan via the Karakhon Pass, halted in the pass, where they put themselves in order and allowed time for slower-moving units to catch up. The units of the division also received supplies of fuel and rations. US supplied Studebaker and Ford trucks arrived to help speed the advance.

On 13 August, in accordance with a verbal order from the division commander, the units of the division took the route from Jarud to Lupei at 03:00. Despite rain and mud, the division marched to Lupei by the end of 14 August, where it concentrated. At Lupei the units turned over their trucks. On 15 August the division commander ordered elements of the division to continue on foot until more trucks could be received. The 57th continued the march from Lupei to Kailu and Tongliao. Due to a shortage of fuel, the 542nd Separate Anti-Aircraft Artillery Battalion, the 76th Separate Medical-Sanitary Battalion, and a repair company were left behind at Lupei. By the end of the day, the units of the division were concentrated 45 kilometers (28 mi) south of Lupei at the village of Khoroail.

On 17 August, the 105th Artillery Regiment and the other artillery units were left behind with their transport due to a shortage of fuel. The motor rifle regiments and the 15th Separate Reconnaissance and 24th Separate Sapper Battalions continued to march towards Tongliao, following the route of Suburrga-Sume, Khorgot, and Ere Modo. The division's motor transport followed the route of Khroail, Kailu, and Tongliao.

At 12:00 on 22 August elements of the division reached Tongliao, where they rested for three hours. By an order of the 6th Guards Tank Army commander on 20 August, the division was to have two of its motor rifle regiments, with reinforcements, concentrate in Mukden by the end of the day on 28 August, leaving a regiment behind in Tongliao for garrison duty. The 293rd Regiment and 180th Anti-Tank (Tank Destroyer) Artillery Battalion were left behind in Tongliao, while the 80th and 127th Regiments, the 24th Separate Sapper Battalion, and the motorcycle company of the 15th Separate Reconnaissance Battalion were ordered to reach Mukden by the end of 28 August. These units formed an operational group of the division.

By the morning of 29 August, the operational group arrived in Mukden and was quartered in a gymnasium, where the Japanese units forming the city garrison were disarmed. Additionally, these elements of the division were ordered to identify depots, relocate prisoners of war to camps near Mukden, guard key locations, and maintain public order. Elements of the division remained in the city until 23 September; 36 detachments of the division were allocated for the escort of Japanese prisoners of war to Soviet territory. The division encountered no Japanese troops during its 950–1,000-kilometer (590–620 mi) march through the Greater Khingan to Mukden. For its march through the Greater Khingan, the division was awarded the honorific Khingan after the end of the campaign.

== Postwar ==
On 10 September, the division was ordered to march back to Tamsagbulag. The units in Tongliao (the 293rd Motor Rifle Regiment, 105th Artillery Regiment, 180th Anti-Tank (Tank Destroyer) Artillery Battalion, 542nd Separate Anti-Aircraft Artillery Battalion, 486th Separate Self-Propelled Artillery Battalion, 76th Separate Medical-Sanitary Battalion, and 32nd Separate Communications Battalion) were ordered to take the route of Tongliao–Kailu–Lupei–Taoan–Wanemiao–Khalun-Arshan–Khandagai–Tamsagbulag on 18 September. On 23 September, the units in Mukden were transported back to Khalun-Arshan by railway echelon. Between 6 and 10 October the 57th's units returned to Tamsagbulag, where they engaged in the refurbishment of barracks and the preparation of peacetime training schedules.

Zakirov was replaced by Colonel Konstantin Lazarev in November 1945. In June 1946, the division was converted into a rifle division. By 1 August the 57th transferred to the 36th Army, part of the Transbaikal–Amur Military District. The division was reduced to the 55th Separate Rifle Regiment in January 1947 as the Soviet Army reduced the size of its infantry forces, before being disbanded in January 1953.

== Commanders ==
The following officers are known to have commanded the division:

- Ivan Onufriyev (1922 – August 1923)
- Nikolay Uvarov (October 1924 – 1928)
- Viktor Dobrovolsky (July 1928 – July 1930)
- Yevgeny Danenberg (February 1931 – August 1935)
- Komdiv Vyacheslav Tsvetayev (February 1937 – July 1938)
- Colonel Ivan Galanin (August 1938 – June 1940)
- Colonel Dmitry Samarsky (17 July 1940 – 20 January 1942)
- Colonel Ivan Khokhlov (21 January 1942 – 1 June 1943)
- Lieutenant Colonel Konstantin Lazarev (assigned but never actually took command; 19 June – 15 July 1943)
- Colonel Viktor Nikiforov (promoted to Major General 16 October 1943; 16 July 1943 – 3 April 1944)
- Lieutenant Colonel Nurey Zakirov (promoted to Colonel 10 August 1944; 4 April 1944 – after 3 September 1945)
- Colonel Konstantin Lazarev (November 1945 – January 1947)
