= 57th Rifle Division (RSFSR) =

Infantry division of the Red Army

- Red Army insignia of the Civil War period
- Active: July 1919–November 1920
- Country: Russian Soviet Federated Socialist Republic
- Branch: Red Army
- Type: Infantry
- Engagements: Russian Civil War; Polish–Soviet War

The 57th Rifle Division (Russian: 57-я стрелковая дивизия) was an infantry division of the Red Army during the Russian Civil War.

Formed in mid-1919, the division fought against the Armed Forces of South Russia on the Southern Front. After the defeat of the former it was transferred west and fought in northwest Ukraine and southern Belarus in the Polish–Soviet War. The 57th served in the westward advance of the Red Army in mid-1920 that ended with the Soviet defeat in the Battle of Warsaw, after which it retreated east into Belarus, where it was disbanded in November of that year.

== History ==
The 57th Rifle Division was formed on 25 July 1919 by an order of the Southern Front of 19 July from the units of the Group of Forces on the Poltava direction, part of the 14th Army. Nikolay Khudyakov became the first division commander on 4 August. From August to October it fought in defensive battles against the Armed Forces of South Russia (AFSR) along the Seym River and in the direction of Poltava. The 57th fought in the Orel–Kursk operation between 11 October and 18 November in the area of Sevsk and Dmitriyev, driving back the AFSR. For the operation, Fyodor Kuznetsov replaced Khudyakov in command of the division. From November to February 1920 the division was part of the reserve of the Southern Front and later the Southwestern Front. The 57th transferred to the 12th Army in February and to the 16th Army in March, fighting in the Polish–Soviet War. It fought near Ovruch and Rechitsa from March, before becoming part of the newly created Mozyr Group of Forces in May. On 24 April Vladimir Kilomovskikh became acting division commander; he was replaced by Vasily Timofeev-Naumov three days later. As part of the group it attacked along the right bank of the Berezina River and helped recapture Mozyr in May and June. Leonty Ugryumov became division commander on 1 June. On 28 June division commissar Nikifor Kolyada took command of the division.

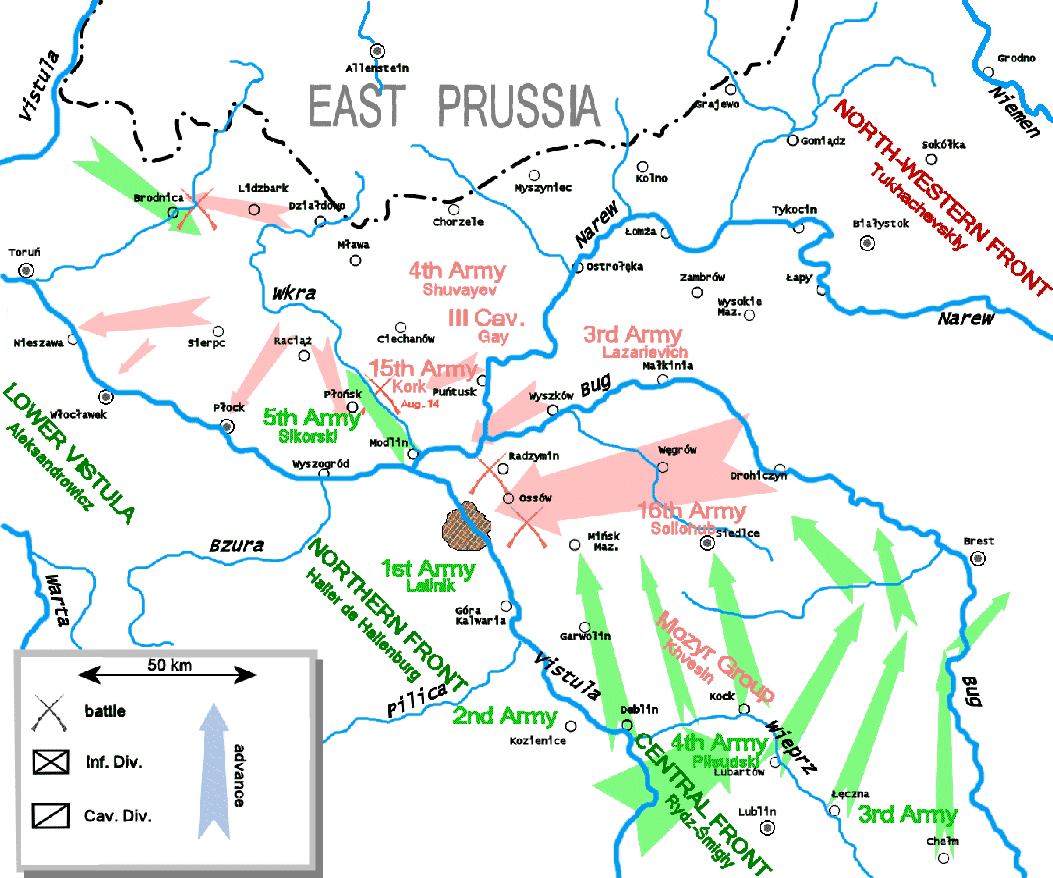
A map of the Polish counterattack in the Battle of Warsaw

Between 4 and 23 July, the division fought in the July Offensive, the renewed Soviet offensive in the war. During the offensive, it advanced westwards, capturing Glusk, Slutsk, and Pinsk. On July 25, the Soviet attack on Warsaw began, culminating in the Battle of Warsaw. With the group, the division advanced from Pinsk to Kobryn and Brest–Litovsk, crossing the Western Bug and Vistula. Division chief of staff Mikhail Olshansky became its commander on 2 August. On 16 August the Polish counterattack in the Battle of Warsaw began by moving through the thinly held, overstretched lines of the Mozyr Group. At Kock a detachment of the 57th was defeated by the Polish 21st Mountain Infantry Division, one of the few Polish encounters with the Mozyr Group on that day. Following the defeat of the Soviet forces in the counterattack, the division retreated with rearguard actions into Belarus. From September to November it fought in the suppression of Stanisław Bułak-Bałachowicz's Belarusian national uprising in the Bobruisk area. In October the 57th was briefly transferred to the 4th Army of the Western Front, and then to the 16th Army. On 11 November the 57th was ordered disbanded by the Western Front and its troops used to reinforce the 4th Rifle Division; the division was disbanded on 19 November. V.V. Shashkin commanded the division between 12 November and its disbandment.
