= 57th Squadron =

57th Squadron may refer to:

- 57th Rescue Squadron
- 57th Weapons Squadron
- 57th Fighter-Interceptor Squadron
- 57th Weather Reconnaissance Squadron
