= 57th Regiment =

57th Regiment or 57th Infantry Regiment may refer to:

- 57th (West Middlesex) Regiment of Foot, a disestablished unit of the British Army
- 57th Infantry Regiment (Philippine Commonwealth Army), a unit of the Philippine Commonwealth Army during the Second World War from 1941 to 1946
- 57th Infantry Regiment (United States), a unit of Philippine scouts serving under United States command during World War II
- 57th Infantry Regiment (Ottoman Army), a unit of the Ottoman Army during WWI
- 57th Line Infantry Regiment a unit of the French Army
- 57th Field Artillery Regiment (2nd/10th Dragoons), RCA, a unit of the Canadian Army
- 57th Infantry Regiment (United States), a unit of the US Army

American Civil War

Union (North) Army

- 57th Illinois Volunteer Infantry Regiment
- 57th Indiana Infantry Regiment
- 57th New York Volunteer Infantry
- 57th Ohio Infantry
- 57th Pennsylvania Infantry
- 57th United States Colored Infantry

Confederate (Southern) Army

- 57th Virginia Infantry

== See also ==
- 57th Division (disambiguation)
