= Mitsubishi Magna =

Mid-size car produced by Mitsubishi (1985-2005)

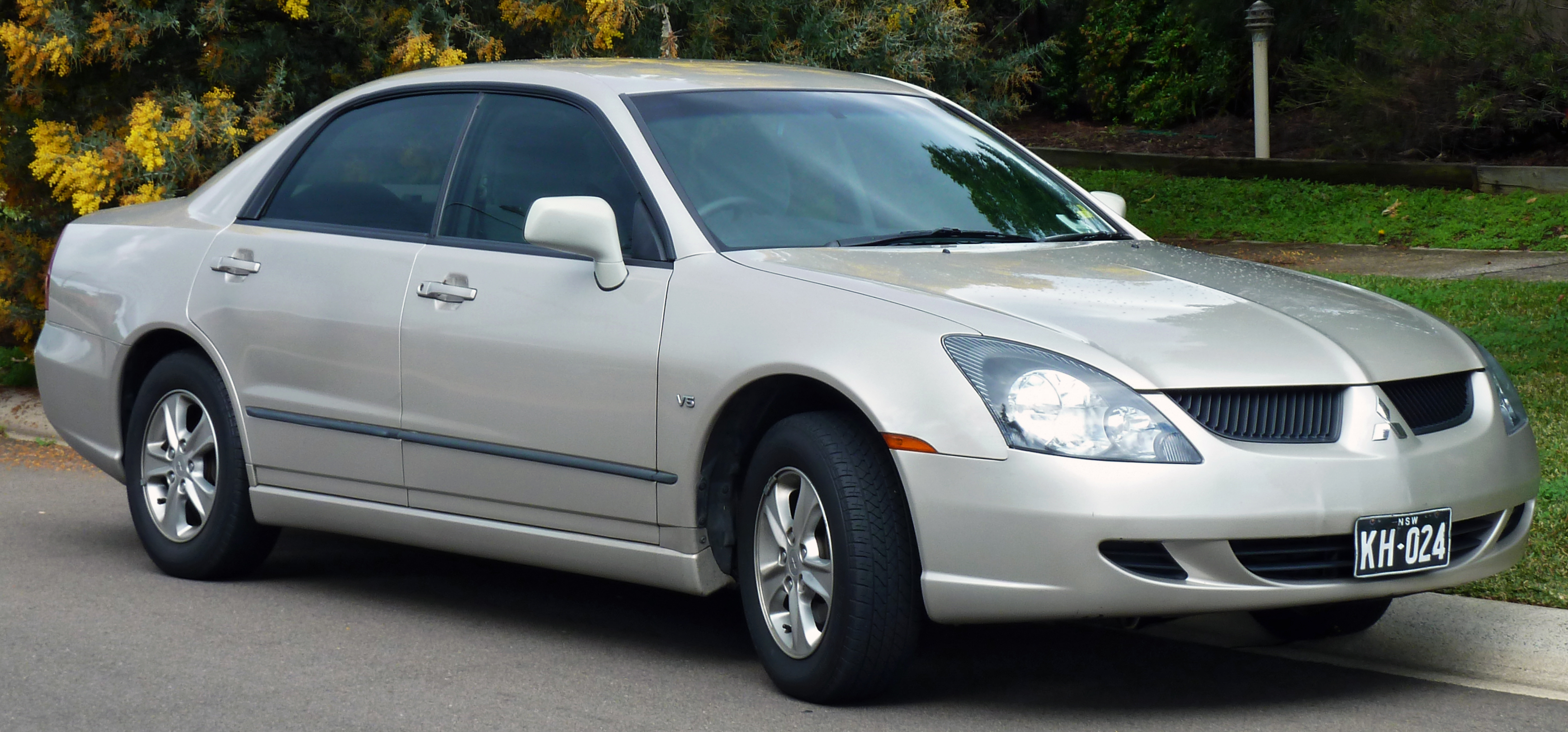
- Mitsubishi Magna LS sedan (TL)

Overview
- Manufacturer: Mitsubishi Motors Australia
- Production: 1985–2005

Body and chassis
- Class: Mid-size car

Chronology
- Predecessor: Mitsubishi Sigma; Chrysler Valiant; Mitsubishi Galant wagon
- Successor: Mitsubishi 380

The Mitsubishi Magna is a mid-size car that was produced over three generations between 1985 and 2005 by Mitsubishi Motors Australia Limited (MMAL). Developed as a replacement for the Mitsubishi Sigma, each Magna generation derived from Japanese platforms re-engineered for the Australian market and conditions. Initially, Magna offered inline-four engines in a mid-size sedan package—a station wagon debuted in 1987. Over the years, each new series grew in size, and with the second generation of 1991, the range was bolstered by a luxury variant called Mitsubishi Verada and a V6 engine. The Magna/Verada became the first Australian-made vehicle to be exported worldwide in large numbers, predominantly as the Mitsubishi Diamante. The third and final iteration Magna/Verada launched in 1996, adding all-wheel-drive (AWD) from 2002, and receiving a substantial styling update in 2003. They were replaced by the Mitsubishi 380 in 2005.

MMAL manufactured the Magna/Verada/lancer at its Clovelly Park, South Australia plant. The majority of its engines—most notably, the original four-cylinder Astron II (codenamed 4G54) and subsequent Cyclone V6 engines (codenamed 6G72 and 6G74)—were manufactured at the Lonsdale, South Australia plant.

== First generation (1985) ==
First generation
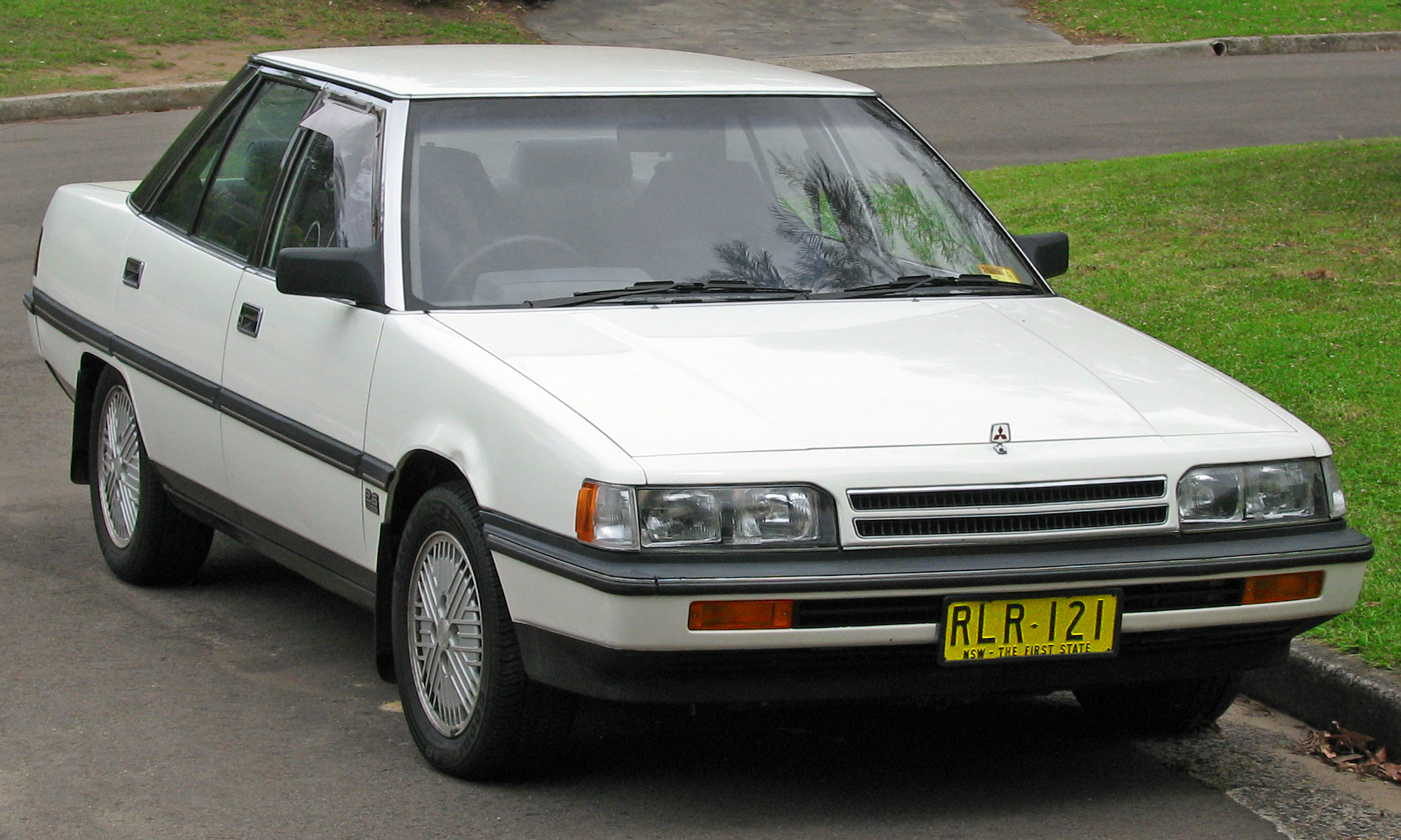
- Magna Elite sedan (TP)

Overview
- Production: April 1985 – March 1991 (sedan); June 1987 – May 1992 (wagon)
- Assembly: Australia: Adelaide, South Australia (Tonsley)

Body and chassis
- Body style: 4-door sedan 5-door station wagon
- Related: Mitsubishi Galant (fifth generation)

Powertrain
- Engine: 2.6-litre Astron II (4G54) I4
- Transmission: 4-speed ELC automatic 5-speed manual

Dimensions
- Wheelbase: 2,600 mm (100 in)
- Length: 4,600 mm (180 in) (1985–86); 4,620 mm (182 in) (1987–91); 4,723 mm (185.9 in) (wagon)
- Width: 1,760 mm (69 in) (1985–86); 1,765 mm (69.5 in) (1987–91)
- Height: 1,400 mm (55 in) (1985–86); 1,396 mm (55.0 in) (1987–91); 1,486 mm (58.5 in) (wagon)
- Kerb weight: 1,193–1,265 kg (2,630–2,789 lb) (1985–86); 1,211–1,321 kg (2,670–2,912 lb) (1987–91); 1,247–1,420 kg (2,749–3,131 lb) (wagon)

Following a claimed A$50 million development cost, Mitsubishi introduced the Magna to Australia in April 1985, initially as a sedan only model, but with a station wagon added in June 1987. It was manufactured at Tonsley Park, South Australia. MMAL designated this first, 1985 Magna as the TM series, with the 1987 and 1989 updates known as the TN and TP series respectively.

Mitsubishi developed the Magna as a replacement for the rear-wheel drive (RWD) Sigma. Previously, Mitsubishi had a larger family car in the form of the mainly six-cylinder Chrysler Valiant, inherited upon MMAL's takeover of Chrysler Australia's operations in 1980. Nevertheless, the Valiant was put out of production the following year, making the medium-sized Sigma MMAL's largest offering. When a replacement became due, MMAL opined that a car's width was a crucial factor to Australian buyers who have traditionally favoured large cars. As a result, to compete more effectively against the large RWD rivals, viz. the Ford Falcon and Holden Commodore, former Chrysler engineers now working for MMAL, developed a wider mid-sized car specific to the Australian market. This model derived from the fifth-generation Japanese Mitsubishi Galant Σ (Sigma), a front-wheel drive (FWD) vehicle released in August 1983. Engineers accomplished this by splicing an extra 65 millimetres (2.6 in) of width through the Galant's body and by strengthening it for Australian road conditions. Mitsubishi Motors codenamed these cars as "YF" and "YFW"—"W" for "wide". To emphasise the size advantage of the Mitsubishi over other medium cars, it was named Magna—deriving from the Latin word magnus, meaning "big".

The only major aesthetic difference of the Magna relative to its Japanese donor was the wider body, as the general styling and side profile were similar also thanks to shared tooling for doors, guards and pillars. While still smaller and lighter than its then current RWD rivals, the Ford Falcon and Holden Commodore, the Magna trumped the latter for interior space due to the inherently superior packaging offered by the FWD layout. As the enlarging added minimal weight and the overall footprint remained smaller compared to rivals, the Magna could make do with a big-bore four-cylinder engine instead of the more traditional six-cylinder engines used by Holden and Ford. Even despite a drag coefficient of Cd=0.36, fuel efficiency was not significantly better. In particular, average fuel consumption was officially rated at 11.0 L/100 km (21.4 mpg_{‑US}) in city driving and 7.8 L/100 km (30 mpg_{‑US}) in highway driving.

The widening approach proved successful for the Australian market, making the Magna a strong competitor against all original competitors envisaged by MMAL, being the Toyota Corona, Holden Camira, Nissan Bluebird, Ford Telstar, plus the larger Holden Commodore. The platform widening also helped influence Honda, Mazda, Nissan, and Toyota to do the same for their mid-size models in international markets, such as in the case of the "wide-bodied" Toyota Camry (XV10) of 1991.

The engine of the Magna was the Australian-made 2.6-litre transversely-mounted inline-four cylinder engine. Codenamed 4G54 and marketed as Astron II, it was a development of the Astron engine (codenamed 4G52) fitted to Sigma. It initially produced 85 kW (114 hp) at 5000 rpm and 198 N⋅m (146 lb⋅ft) at 3000 rpm. Astron II was an eight-valve single overhead cam (SOHC) design with advanced features for the time, such as hydraulic mounts and "Silent Shaft" counterbalancing technology, designed and licensed to other automakers by Mitsubishi Motors to reduce the vibrations inherent in large four-cylinder engines. In the TM series, these engines were carbureted, with Mitsubishi's "ECI Multi" electronic fuel injection (EFI) version launched with the TN series, boosting power to 93 kW (125 hp).

Magna was fitted with either a five-speed manual or a four-speed ELC automatic transmission with electronic control and overdrive (a button on the shift lever providing the ability to switch between the default three-speed mode or overdrive four-speed). The Executive and luxury Elite models, however, were available only in automatic. In terms of suspension, Magna's front comprised MacPherson struts front design and, at the rear, a three-link torsion beam axle with coil springs (specifically, a torsion beam axle, located by two trailing arms and a Panhard rod). The wagons ran a four-link beam axle with coil springs.

Between 1985 and 1990, MMAL sold almost 209,000 Magnas.

=== TM ===
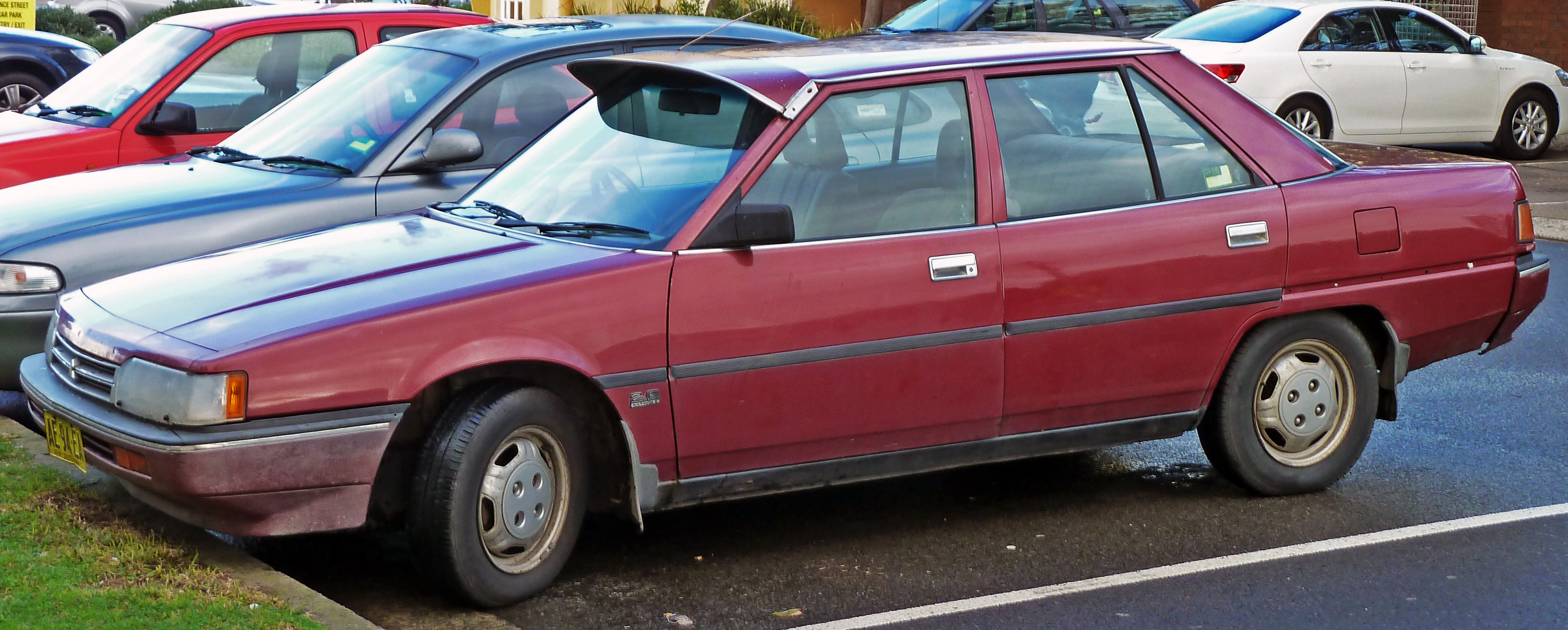

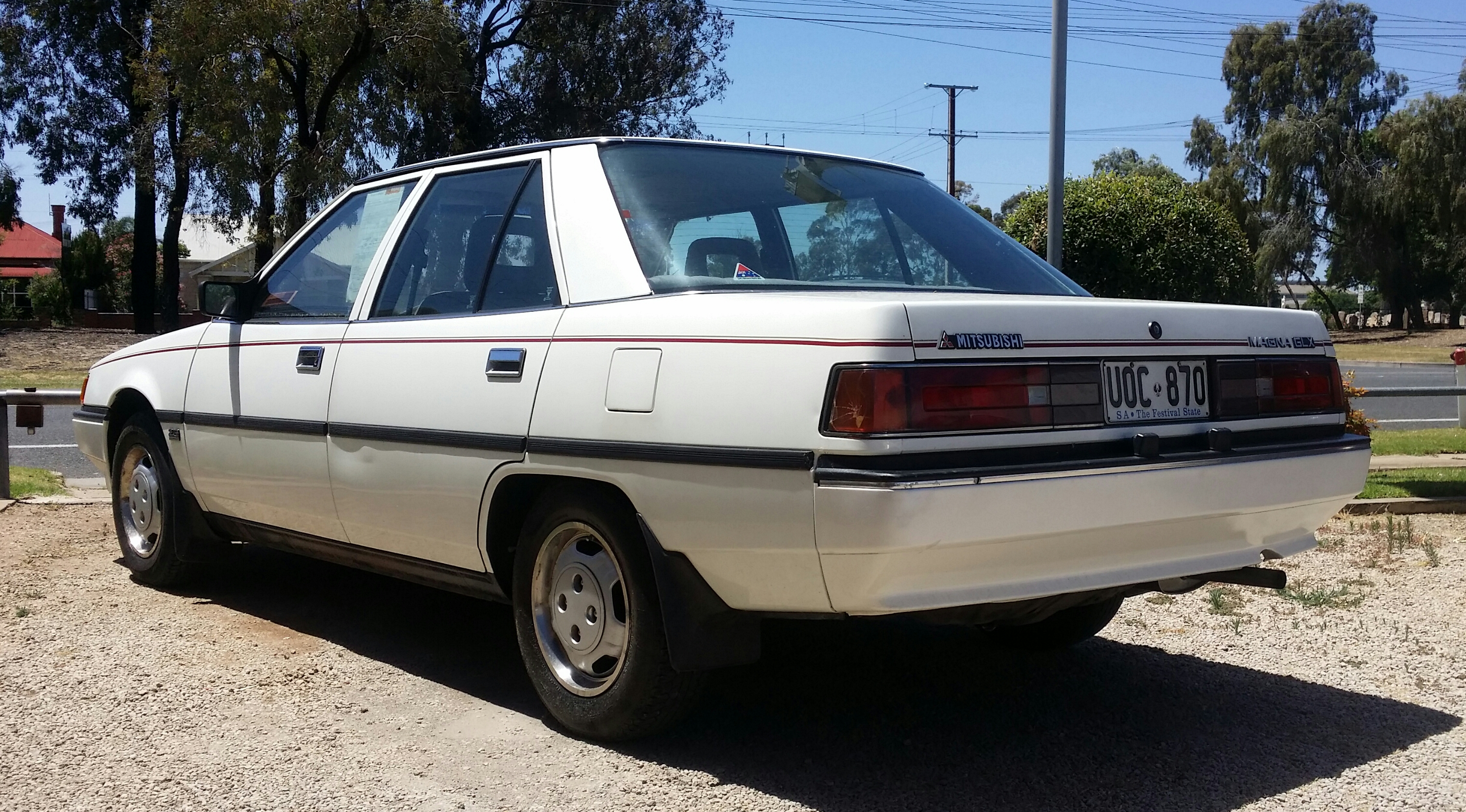
Magna GLX sedan (TM)

At launch in April 1985, the TM series included the following models: the base GLX, the mid-range SE and the high-end Elite. August 1986 saw the range expanded with a better-than-GLX equipped model known as the "Executive". Aimed at fleet buyers, this new variant added full plastic wheel coverings, standard power steering and automatic transmission with air conditioning as the sole option. The luxury-oriented models—SE and Elite—featured higher equipment: seats were covered in velour trim with the driver's seat being seven-way adjustable (instead of four-way); lumbar support for driver and passenger; rear integrated headrests and folding centre armrest with boot access; map lights and remote boot release; power windows, central locking and alloy wheels (standard on Elite and optional on SE); metallic paint standard (two-tone standard on Elite and single-tone optional on Elite and SE); radio/cassette players (featuring a novel security system that would make the unit completely inoperable in the event that its power was disconnected) with the Elite also adding a rear quarter panel electric antenna, separate equaliser and steering wheel controls. In addition, instead of standard control steering stalks and ventilation panel on the centre console, both the SE and Elite had two steering side pods, thus bringing all major controls within a driver's fingertips and making them jointly height adjustable with the steering column. Elite also featured an LCD instrument panel, in line with the Japanese automotive trend in the late 1980s. Common to all models were a tilt adjustable steering and cable-operated fuel filler door release. Non-Elite models also had a roof mounted manual antenna above the right A-pillar and the following optional equipment: air conditioning (GLX, Executive and SE), power steering and automatic transmission (GLX and SE).

Sale prices were a key critical factor in Magna's market competitiveness, since for less money, MMAL was able to sell a more refined and economical package relative to its main rivals. This was especially reflected in the merits highlighted under the "value for money" category of the Wheels Car of the Year title won by Magna in 1985.

The TM series was marred by various quality-control problems (chiefly, fragile engine heads and automatic transmissions), which were gradually rectified throughout the life of the first generation.

=== TN ===
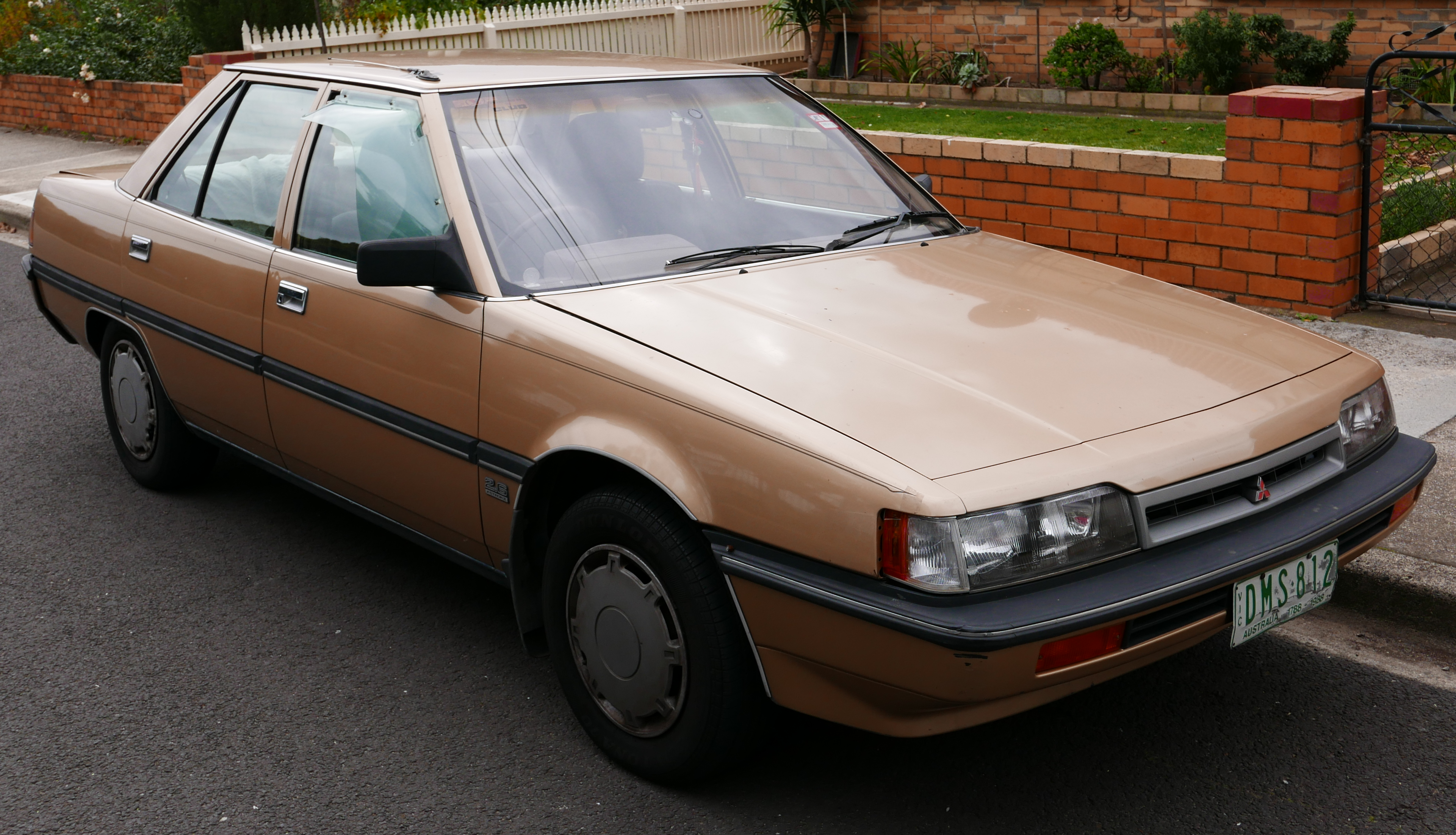
Magna GLX sedan (TN)

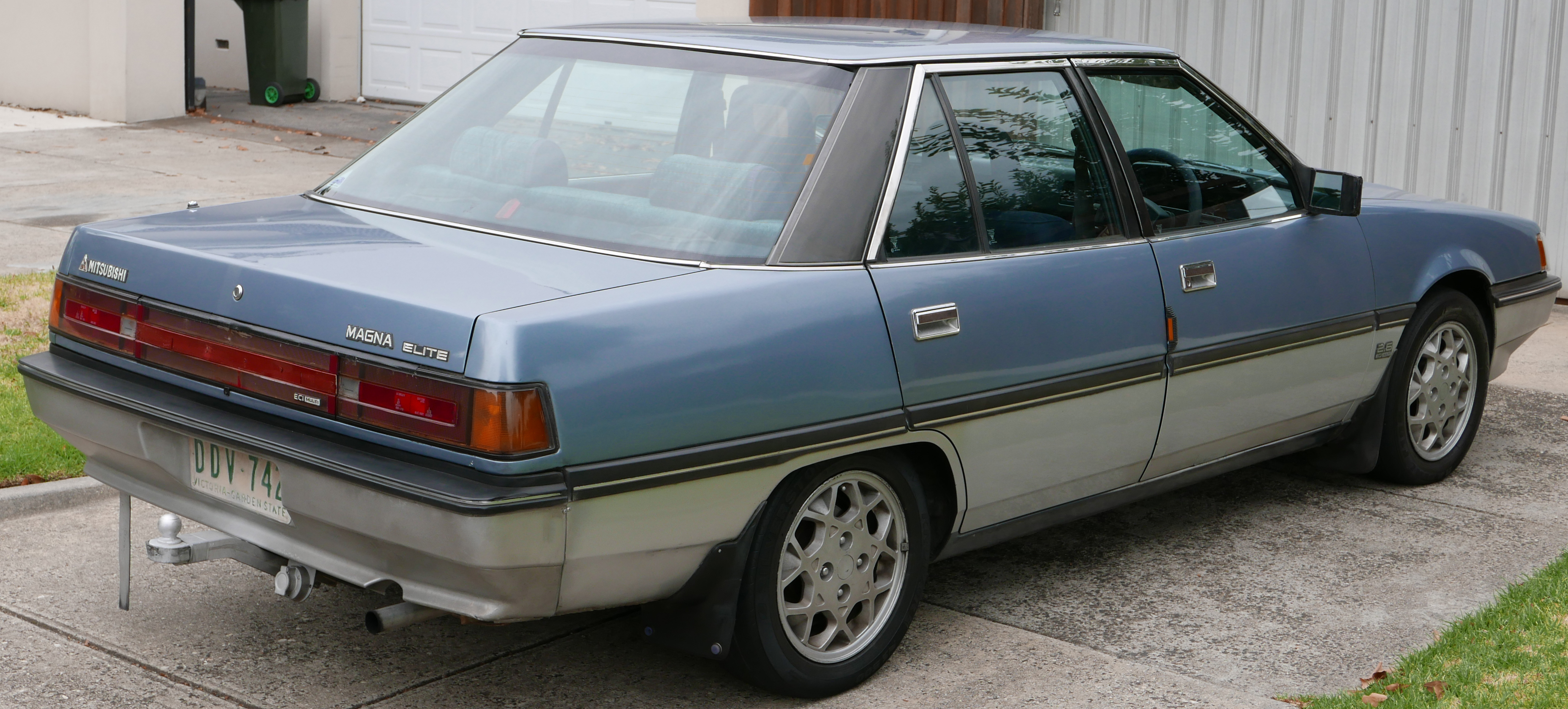
Magna Elite sedan (TN)

April 1987 brought the first update to Magna, designated TN. Cosmetic changes included a new grille insert, the relocation of the rear license plate to the bumper and revised trim. Better seats, an optional EFI engine upgrade, revised automatic transmission, improved audio and more equipment marked the changes which kept sales strong.

From June 1987, a station wagon body variant engineered and exclusively built in Australia, broadened Magna's appeal with the public and fleet buyers further. In June 1988, a sporty Elante model (with EFI, sportier suspension tuning and bodykit) and an Elite wagon also arrived.

=== TP ===
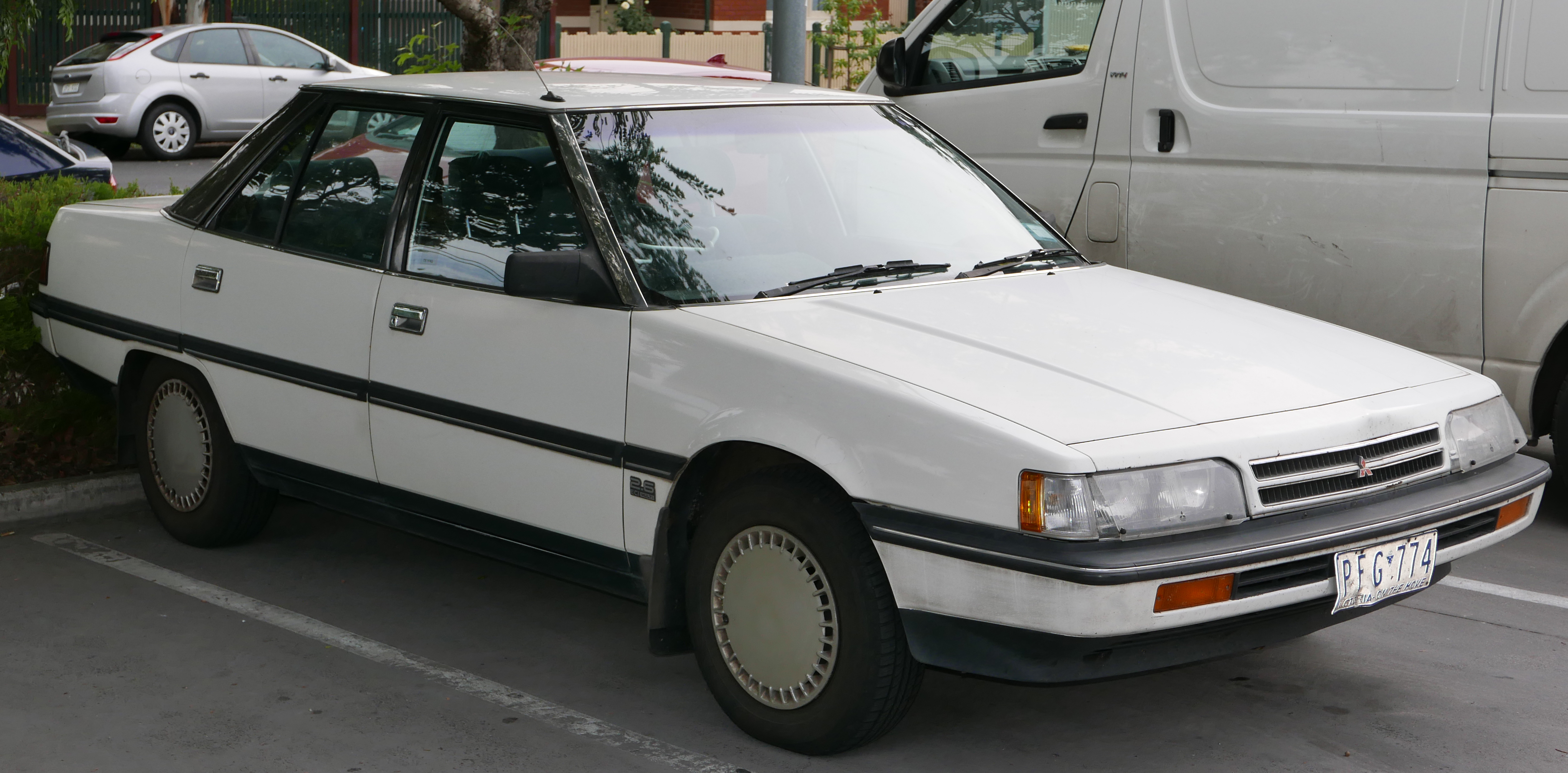
Magna SE sedan (TP)

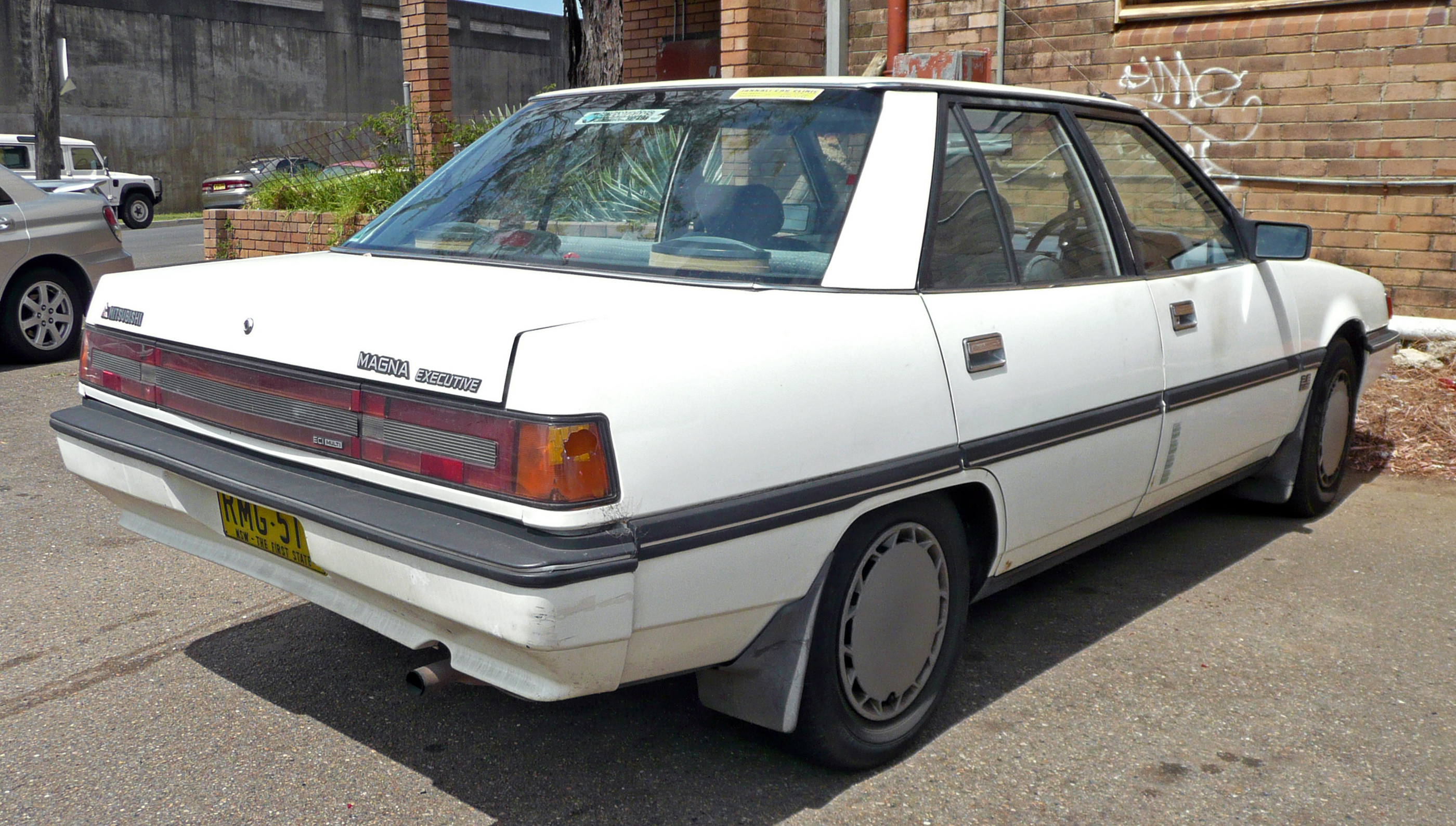
Magna Executive sedan (TP)

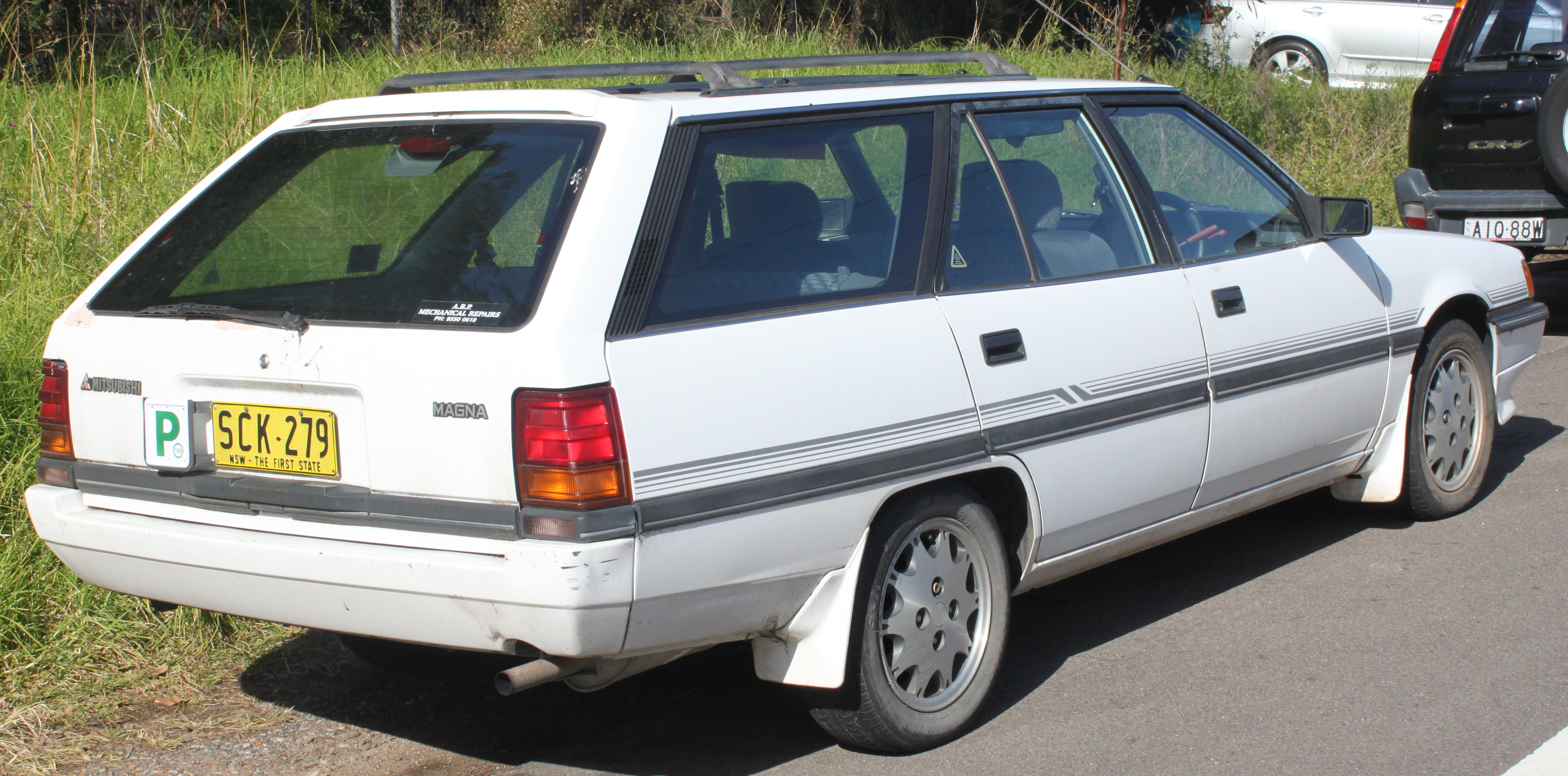
Magna Grand Tourer wagon (TP)

In June 1989, a final update and facelift of the first generation Magna was launched, known as the TP series. Trimmings were again updated with a further revised grille insert and rear lights fascia (now featuring a grey row) as well as new wheels designs and paint colours. An improved four-speed automatic transmission, interior console and seats were also part of the update. Power steering became standard across the range during 1990, as did EFI except for the base GLX. Manual transmission was now available on the Executive. In September 1990, a Grand Tourer model of 1,000 sedans came to the market with bigger wheels, the Elante's tauter suspension set-up and EFI. Grand Tourers were offered in white (500 units), 250 in burgundy, 250 in "Riviera Blue", and also featured a full bodykit, gold striping and gold alloy wheels.

The TP sedan remained in production until April 1991 whereas the station wagon continued to be sold alongside the new TR series Magna sedan until May 1992. Several limited editions were introduced to support sales. These included the GLX-based Encore sedan and wagon of May 1991 with air-conditioning as standard. Then in September 1991, 500 more Grand Tourers were released—this time as station wagons featuring silver striping and silver alloy wheels from the Elante. The Grand Tourer wagons all had EFI engines. The final run of production consisted of 500 units of the Executive Safari wagon in November 1991, all with EFI and automatic transmission.

=== List of models ===
TM (1985–1987)

- GLX (carbureted; manual and automatic)
- Executive (carbureted; manual and automatic)
- SE (carbureted; manual and automatic)
- Elite (carbureted; automatic)

TN (1987–1989)

- GLX (carbureted and EFI; manual and automatic)
- Executive (carbureted and EFI; automatic)
- SE (carbureted and EFI; manual and automatic)
- Elite (EFI; automatic)
- Elante sedan (EFI; manual and automatic)

Limited editions:

- Challenge (EFI; manual and automatic)

TP (1989–1991)

- GLX (carbureted and EFI; manual and automatic)
- Executive (carbureted and EFI; manual and automatic)
- SE (EFI; manual and automatic)
- Elite (EFI; automatic)
- Elante sedan (EFI; manual and automatic)

Limited editions:

- Encore (EFI, manual and automatic)
- Grand Tourer sedan (EFI; manual and automatic)
- Grand Tourer wagon (EFI; manual and automatic)
- Safari wagon (EFI; manual and automatic)

== Second generation (1991) ==
Second generation
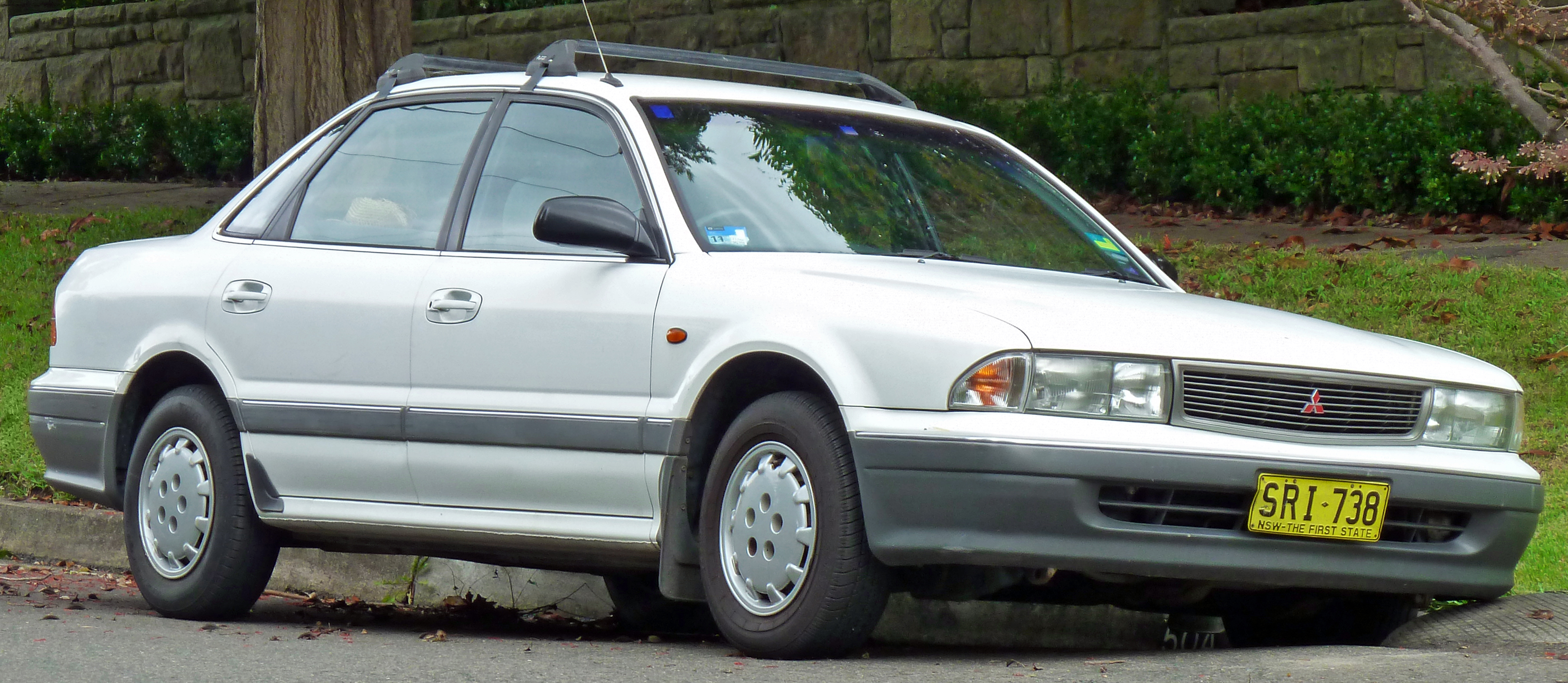
- Magna Executive sedan (TR)

Overview
- Model code: TR/TS
- Also called: Mitsubishi Diamante; Mitsubishi Sigma (Europe); Mitsubishi Verada; Mitsubishi V3000 (New Zealand)
- Production: April 1991 – March 1996 (sedan); May 1992 – March 1997 (wagon)
- Assembly: Japan: Nagoya; Australia: Adelaide, South Australia (Tonsley)
- Designer: Shinichi Mitsuhashi

Body and chassis
- Body style: 4-door sedan 5-door station wagon
- Related: Mitsubishi Diamante (first generation)

Powertrain
- Engine: 2.6-litre Astron II (4G54) I4; 3.0-litre Cyclone (6G72) V6
- Transmission: 4-speed INVECS automatic 5-speed manual

Dimensions
- Wheelbase: 2,722 mm (107.2 in)
- Length: 4,746 mm (186.9 in)
- Width: 1,775 mm (69.9 in)
- Height: 1,430 mm (56.3 in)
- Kerb weight: 1,356 kg (2,989 lb)

=== TR / KR ===
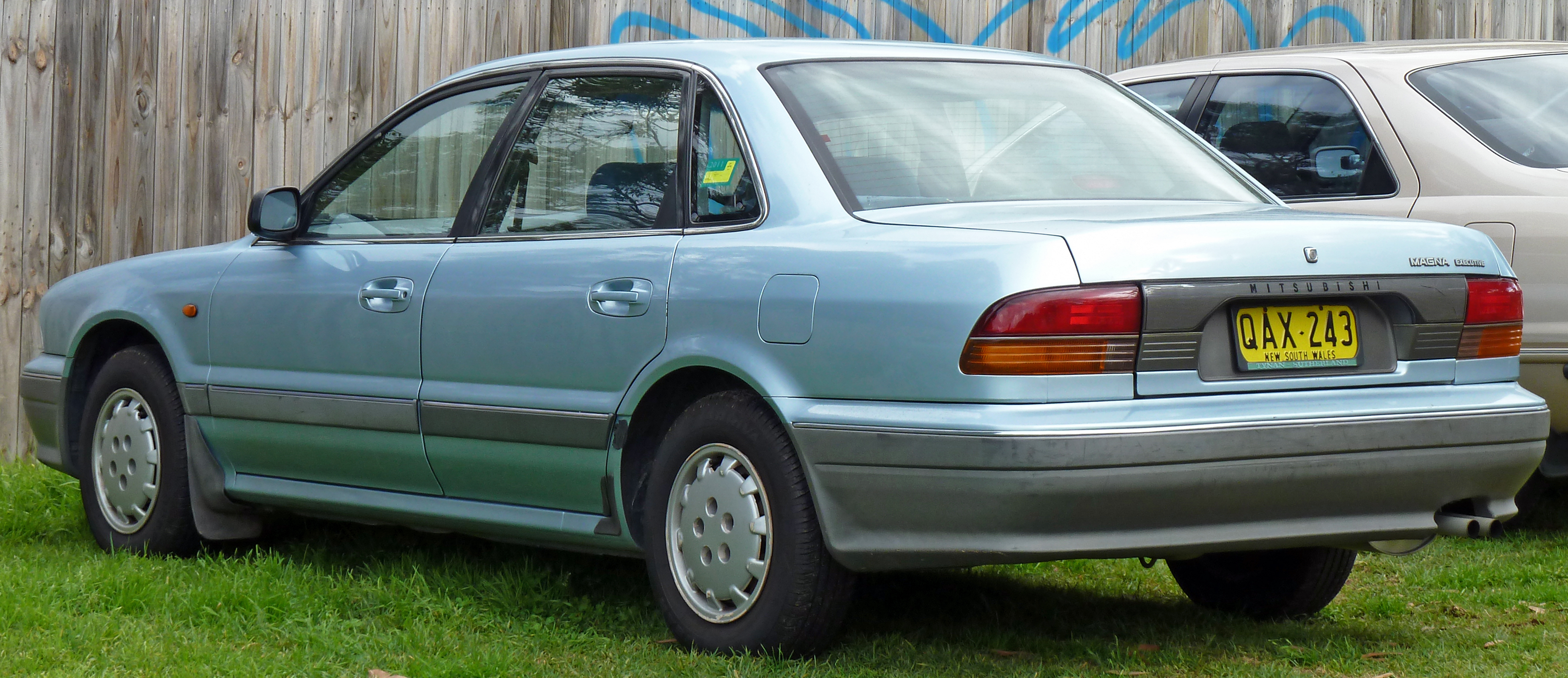
Magna Executive sedan (TR)

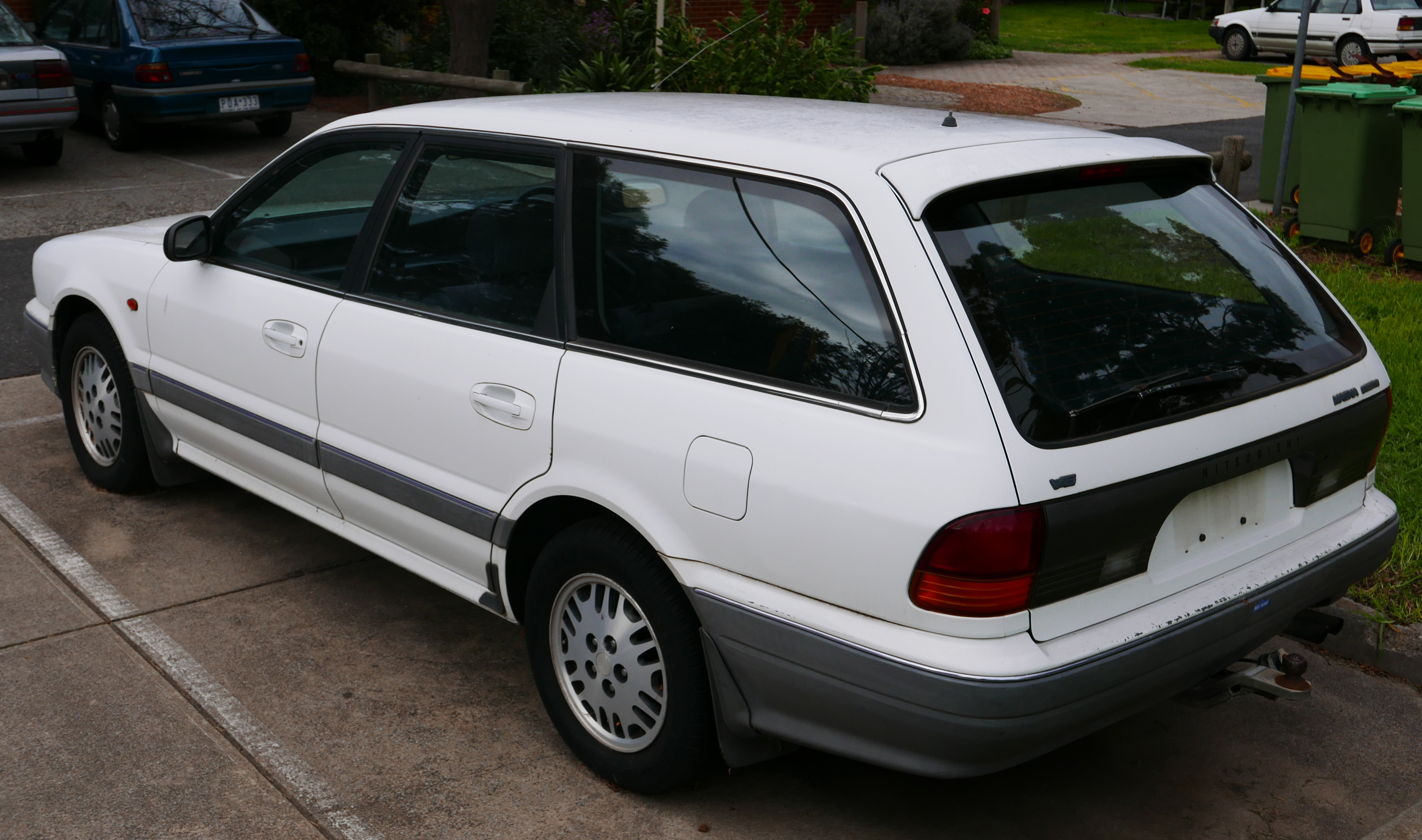
Magna Executive V6 wagon (TR)

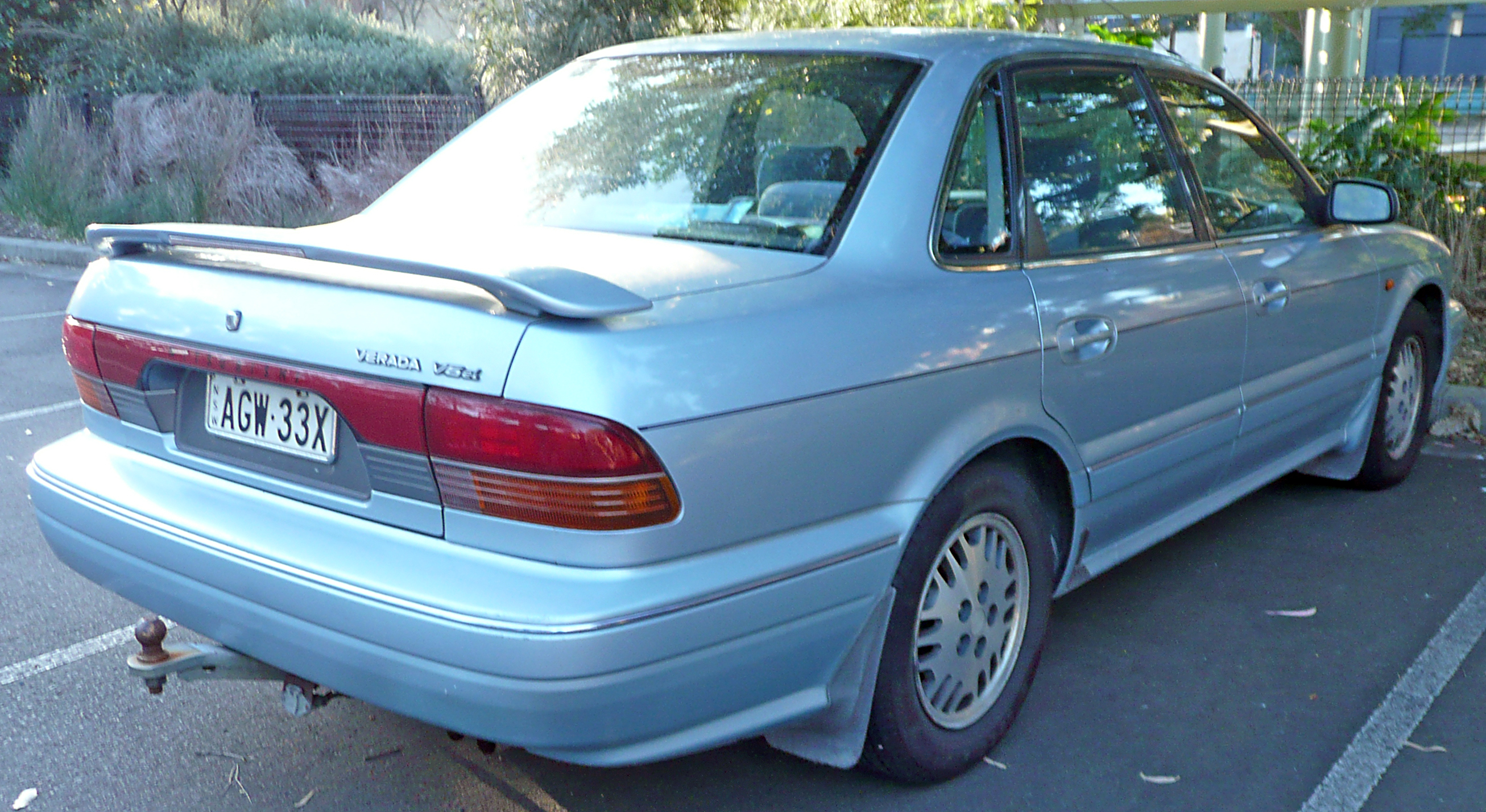
Verada Ei (KR)

Magna was reengineered from the ground-up with the introduction of a larger sedan in April 1991, and station wagon in May 1992. This series was designated TR and carried over its powertrain from the previous generation. Unlike the first generation whose wide-body was designed and engineered in Australia, this second generation inherited the already wide-body Japanese Mitsubishi Sigma platform on which it was based, were created by splicing an extra 66 millimetres (2.6 in) down the middle of the platform of the sixth-generation Mitsubishi Galant, released in 1987. MMAL estimated that, between 1989 (when the project started) and the wagon's arrival in 1992, the total investment in the new Magna totalled some A$389 million.

Though more aerodynamic with a drag coefficient of Cd=0.33, the TR series was also some 100 kilograms (220 lb) heavier than the first. The venerable Astron II engine was upgraded to, and only available with, EFI. As a result, the engine outputs now increased to 98 kW (131 hp) at 4750 rpm and 212 N⋅m (156 lb⋅ft) at 3750 rpm on ULP 91 RON petrol, and 102 kW (137 hp) at 4750 rpm and 220 N⋅m (160 lb⋅ft) at 4000 rpm on PULP 95 RON fuel. Later in 1991, Mitsubishi reintroduced a GLX base model, which was only carbureted and was priced lower than the other models to make the new Magna more appealing to fleet buyers.

In July 1991, MMAL introduced an upmarket derivative called the Mitsubishi Verada with a 3.0-litre V6 engine and codenamed KR series. Both Magna and Verada shared the same body, although the latter featured a unique grille and larger bumpers from the US export models as well as luxury fittings. The Australian-made 3.0-litre V6 was codenamed 6G72 and marketed as Cyclone. Its outputs ranged from 120 kW (161 hp) at 5500 rpm and 235 N⋅m (173 lb⋅ft) at 4000 rpm on ULP 91, to 124 kW (166 hp) at 5500 rpm and 244 N⋅m (180 lb⋅ft) at 3000 rpm on PULP. The automatic transmissions used by both four- and six-cylinder models was marketed INVECS.

While Australia continued to endure the early 1990s recession, MMAL's ambitions to compete more directly with Ford and Holden with a six-cylinder Magna remained on hold. Finally, in 1993, with the economy recovering and oil prices stabilised after the Gulf War, the Verada's V6 engine was offered on Magna for the first time—albeit as an option. This 3.0-litre V6 was only available on the Executive, which was also equipped with larger 15-inch wheels and different interior trim. A small "V6" badge on the boot lid distinguished the six- from the four-cylinder model.

At launch, the TR series comprised the Magna Executive sedan, SE sedan, and the automatic sedan-only Elite. Of the V6-engined Verada range, the Ei version was equipped to about the same level as a Magna SE, with the exception that air-conditioning was standard. The top of the range Verada Xi also included alloy wheels, keyless door entry, climate control, cruise control, an upmarket sound system, steering wheel controls for cruise and sound system, power windows, electrically adjustable driver's seat, power antenna, and security system. Furthermore, the Xi featured an electronically controlled suspension with four-way adjustable shock absorbers (dampers) and adjustable pneumatic springs in addition to the standard coil springs. This system automatically adjusts spring and damper rates commensurate with road conditions, speed and driving style. An anti-lock braking system (ABS) and driver's airbag became available for the first time on both Veradas.

The New Zealand export cars were badged Magna and V3000, depending on their respective fitment of four- and six-cylinder engines. The four-cylinder Magna model range comprised a GLX and Super Saloon, whereas the V3000 comprised an Executive, Super Saloon (renamed Elite for wagons) and SEi.

The new Australian-made Mitsubishi was designed to be exported internationally and its build quality reflected this engineering intent, with planned initial station wagon volumes of 10,000 units per year to Japan, the US, UK and New Zealand for an eventual total of 40,000 units per year. The Verada station wagon formed the basis of MMAL's large export programme under the Diamante and Sigma names, with Australia the only source of these wagons worldwide.

=== TS / KS ===
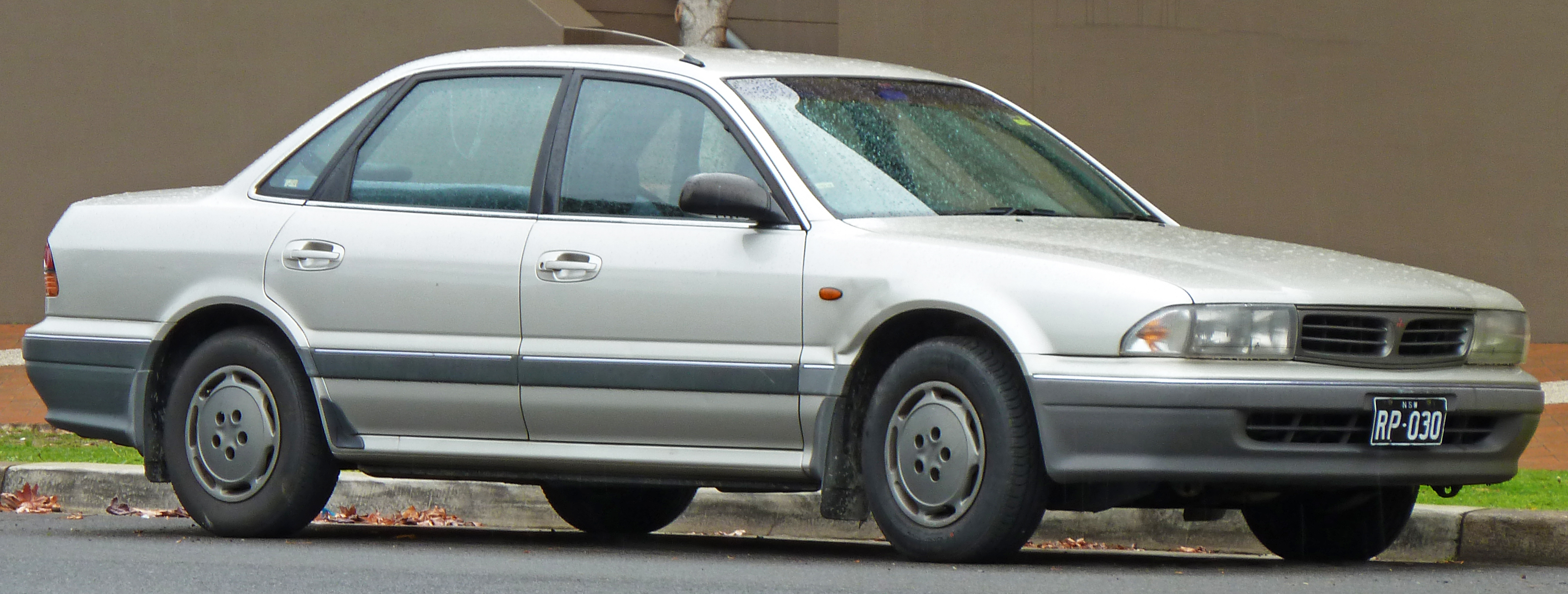

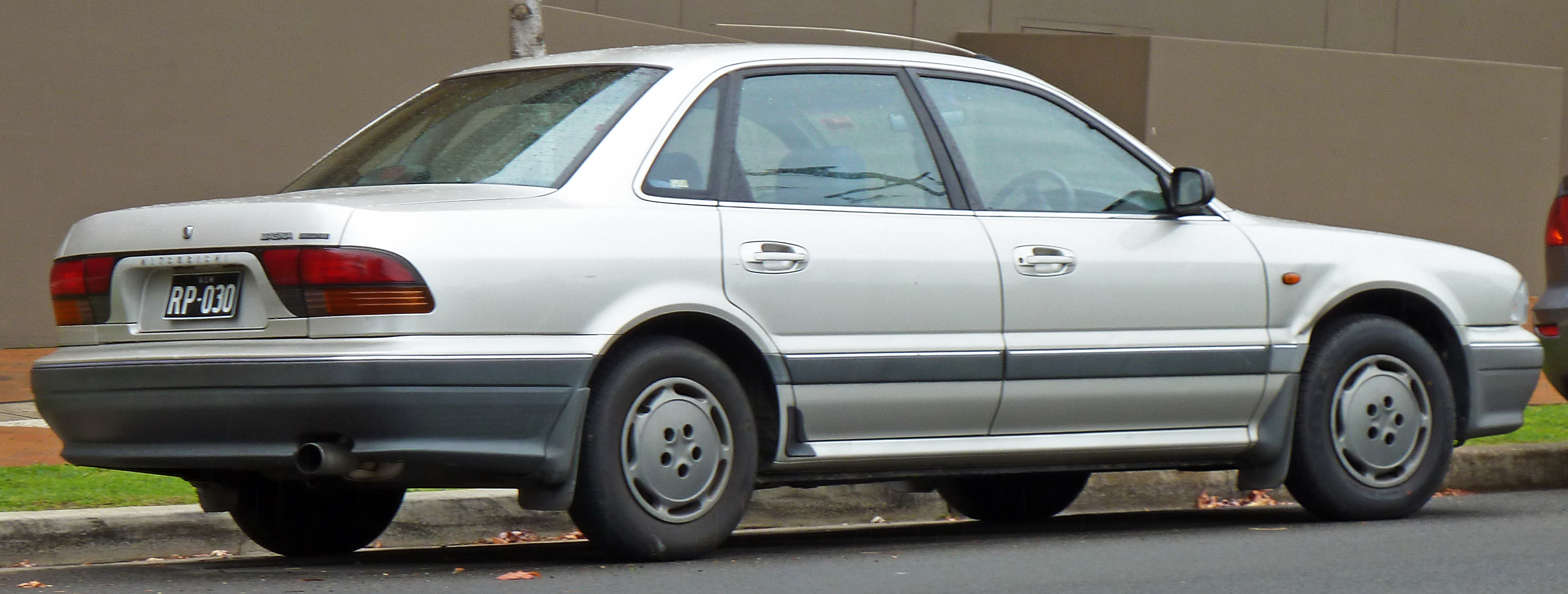
Magna Executive sedan (TS)

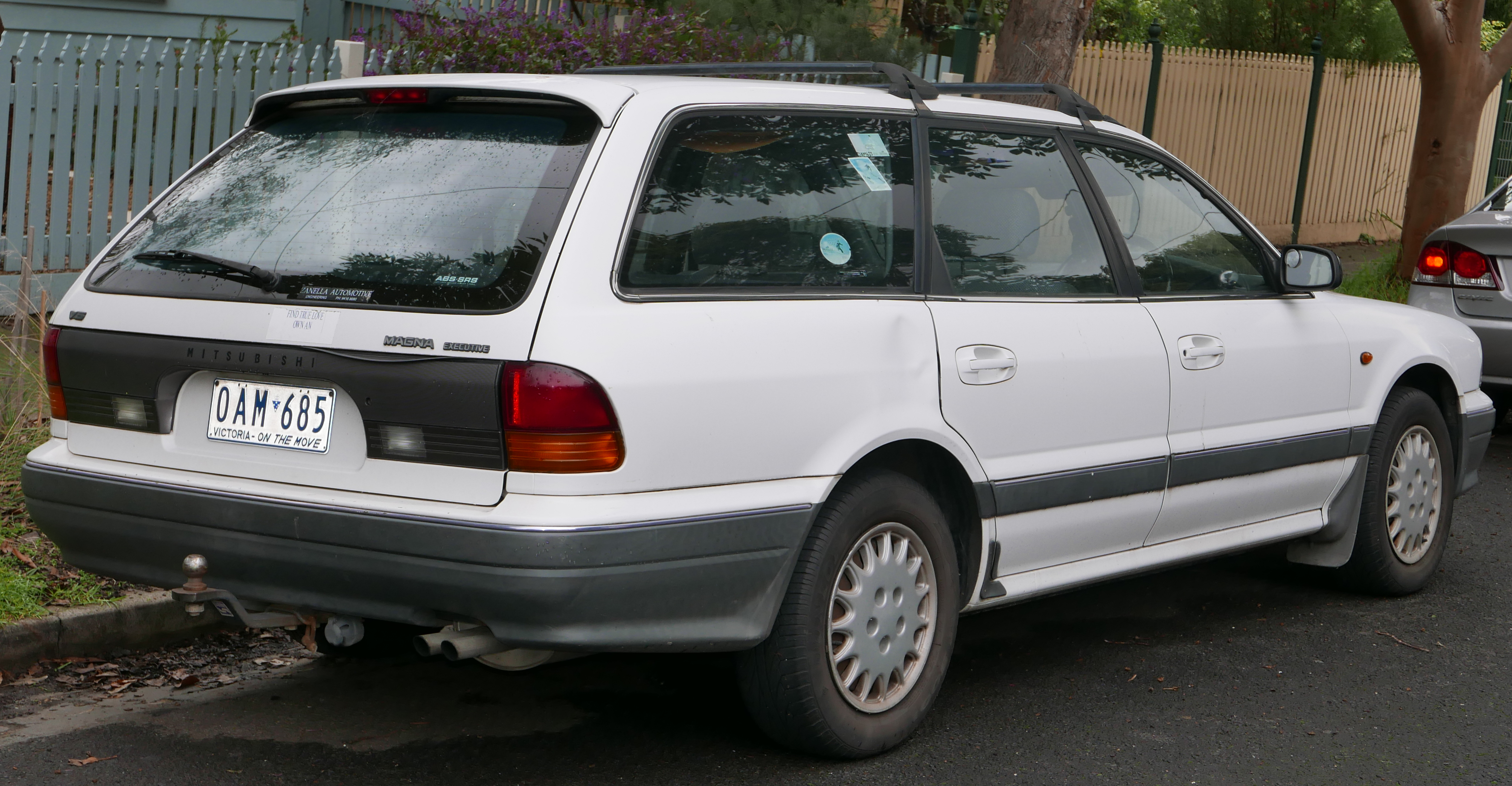
Magna Executive V6 wagon (TS)

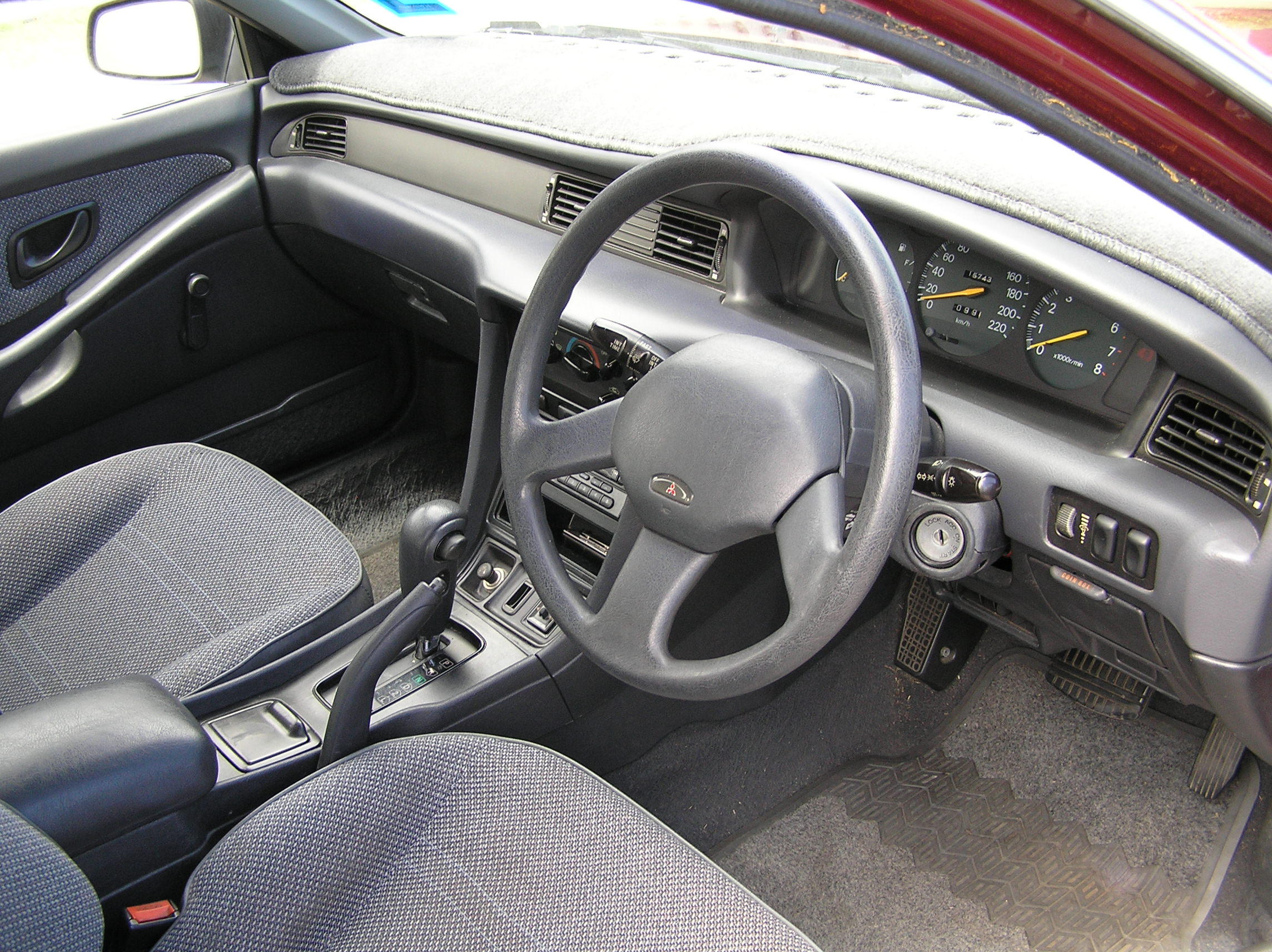
Magna Executive interior (TS)

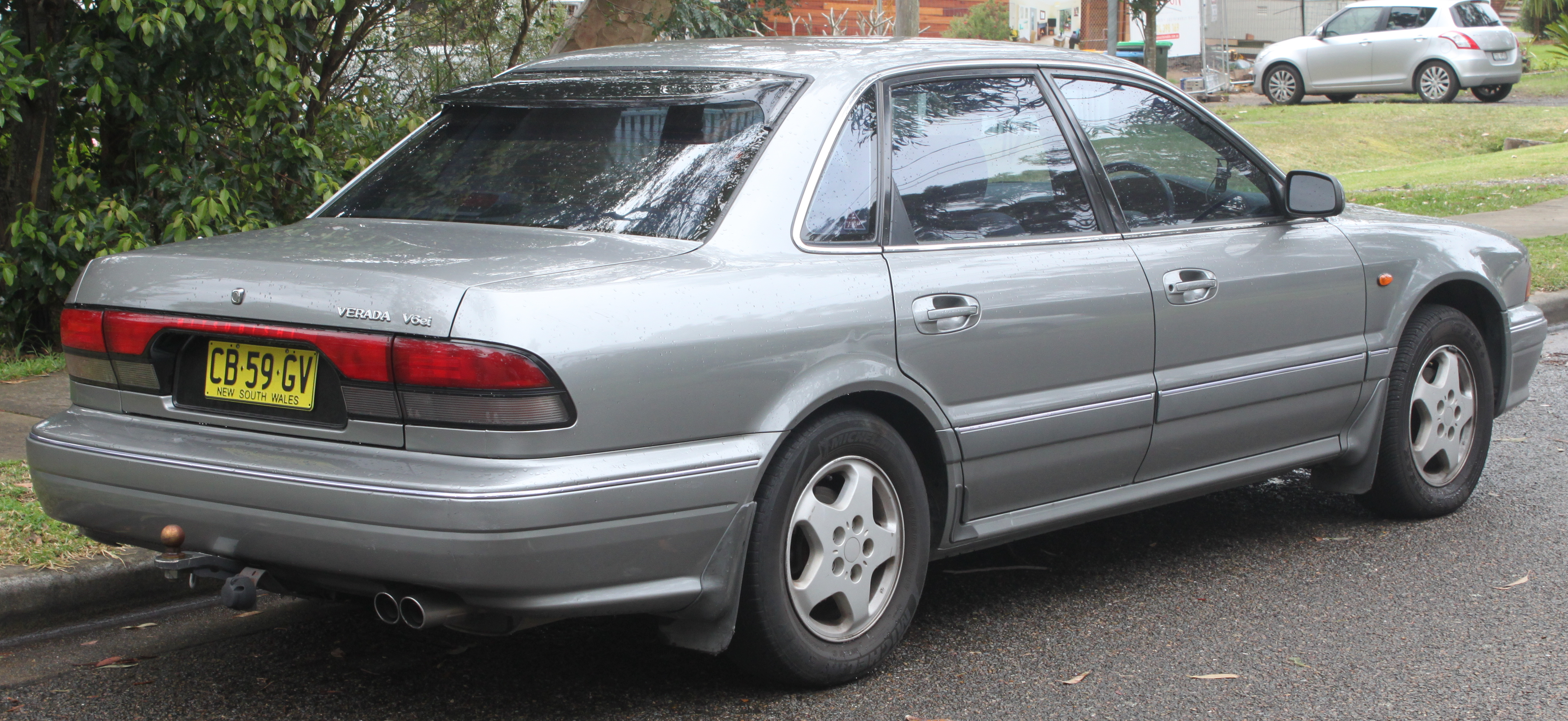
Verada Ei sedan (KS)

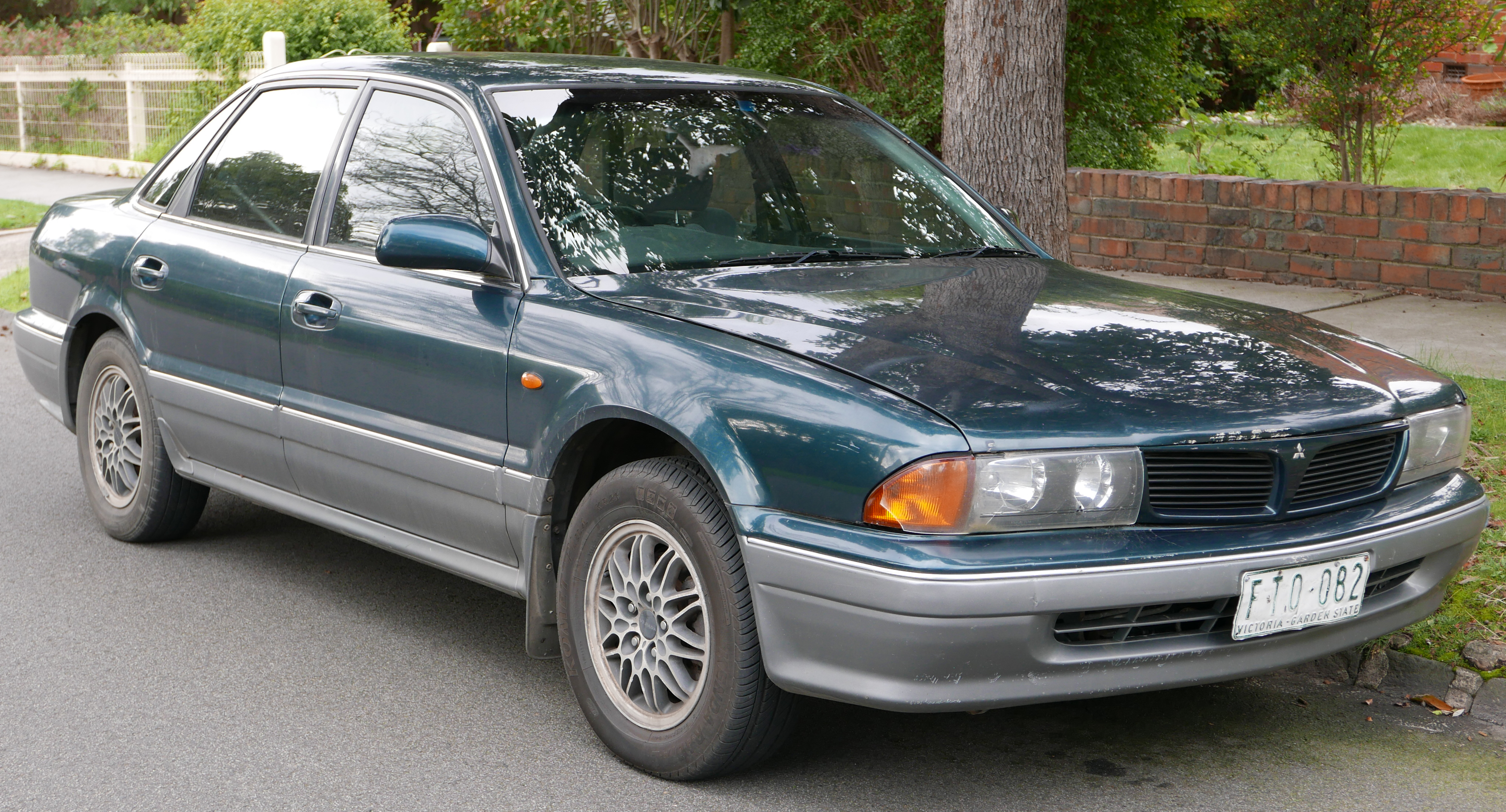
Verada Xi sedan (KS)

All models were facelifted in March 1994, with the arrival of the new TS and KS series. Their respective engines were further upgraded and, apart from revised wheel trims, the revised Magna sedans were also identifiable by a new colour-keyed boot garnish around the licence plate, instead of the previous grey. The revised Verada received additional equipment previously reserved for export markets. These included a more distinctive front grille, more expensive multi-parabola headlights relative to single units (the first Australian-built car to adopt these and a distinguishing figure for future luxury and sports Magna-derivatives) and greater cabin equipment to maintain a more premium status than the increasingly popular Magna V6. In December 1995, the export version of the V6 wagon was sold locally as the Verada Touring wagon, in a limited edition of only 81 manuals and 99 automatics.

The successful introduction of the Verada as the luxury flagship and upmarket shift of the Magna SE, resulted in the demise of the Magna Elite. The TS and KS series were replaced by the all-new third generation TE and KE series in 1996, however, the wagons remained for sale up to 1997 pending the delayed arrival of a new generation wagon.

=== List of models ===
TR (1991–1994)

- GLX (carbureted; manual and automatic)
- Executive (EFI; manual and automatic)
- Executive V6 (manual and automatic)
- SE (EFI; manual and automatic)
- Elite (EFI; automatic)

Limited editions:

- Profile sedan (automatic)

TS (1994–1996)

- GLX (carbureted; manual and automatic)
- Executive (EFI; manual and automatic)
- Executive V6 (manual and automatic)
- Advance V6 (manual and automatic)
- SE (EFI; manual and automatic)
- SE V6 (automatic) — the SE contained many of the interior upgrades from the Verada, including power windows and red door lights. The bumpers were also body coloured, however they were the shorter Magna variant.

Limited editions:

- Challenge sedan and wagon
- Profile wagon (manual and automatic)
- Safari wagon (manual and automatic)
- V6Si sedan (released in August 1994; 400 units built, 120 with manual and 280 with automatic transmission; standard interior colour was blue with Albans trim replacing Dawson trim; exterior paint available were only Sarajevo White, Mirage Silver and Calypso Red; extra features included: V6Si decal to right hand side deck lid and both front quarter panels; 5-spoke 15-inch alloy wheel (type J42); body coloured grille, side protection mouldings, front and rear mud flaps; deck lid spoiler including high-mounted stop light; dual exhaust muffler outlets; air conditioning; ABS brakes).

== Third generation (1996) ==
Third generation
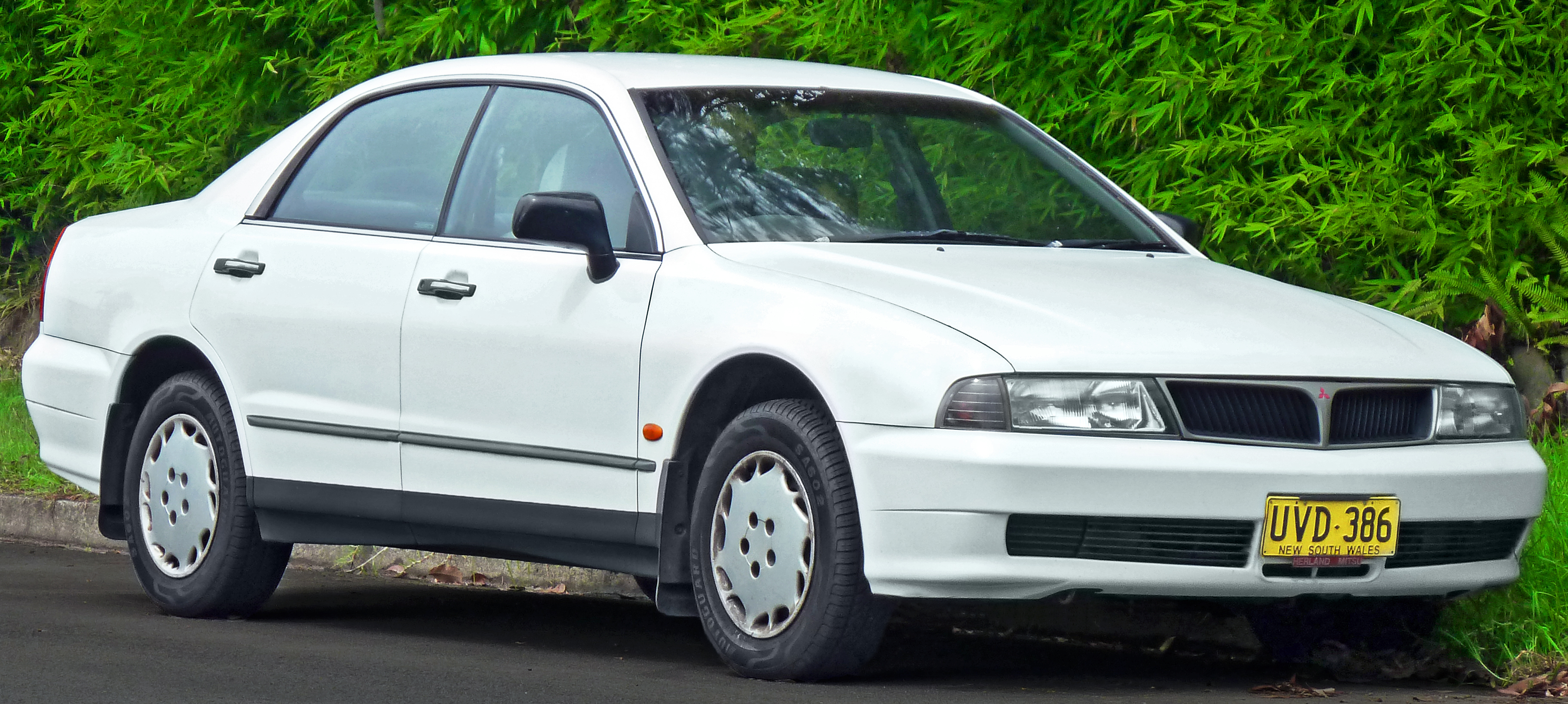
- Magna sedan (TE)

Overview
- Also called: Mitsubishi Sigma (Middle East, TF & TH Series); Mitsubishi Diamante; Mitsubishi Verada
- Production: April 1996 – September 2005 (sedan); March 1997 – September 2005 (wagon)
- Assembly: Japan: Nagoya; Australia: Adelaide, South Australia (Tonsley)
- Designer: Akinori Nakanishi; Olivier Boulay (TL/KL)

Body and chassis
- Body style: 4-door sedan 5-door station wagon
- Related: Mitsubishi Diamante (second generation)

Powertrain
- Engine: 2.4-litre Sirius (4G64) I4; 3.0-litre Cyclone (6G72) V6; 3.5-litre Cyclone (6G74) V6
- Transmission: 4-speed INVECS II automatic 4-speed Tiptronic automatic 5-speed Tiptronic automatic 5-speed manual

Dimensions
- Wheelbase: 2,722 mm (107.2 in)
- Length: 4,746 mm (186.9 in)
- Width: 1,775 mm (69.9 in)
- Height: 1,430 mm (56.3 in)
- Kerb weight: 1,372 kg (3,025 lb)

=== TE / KE ===
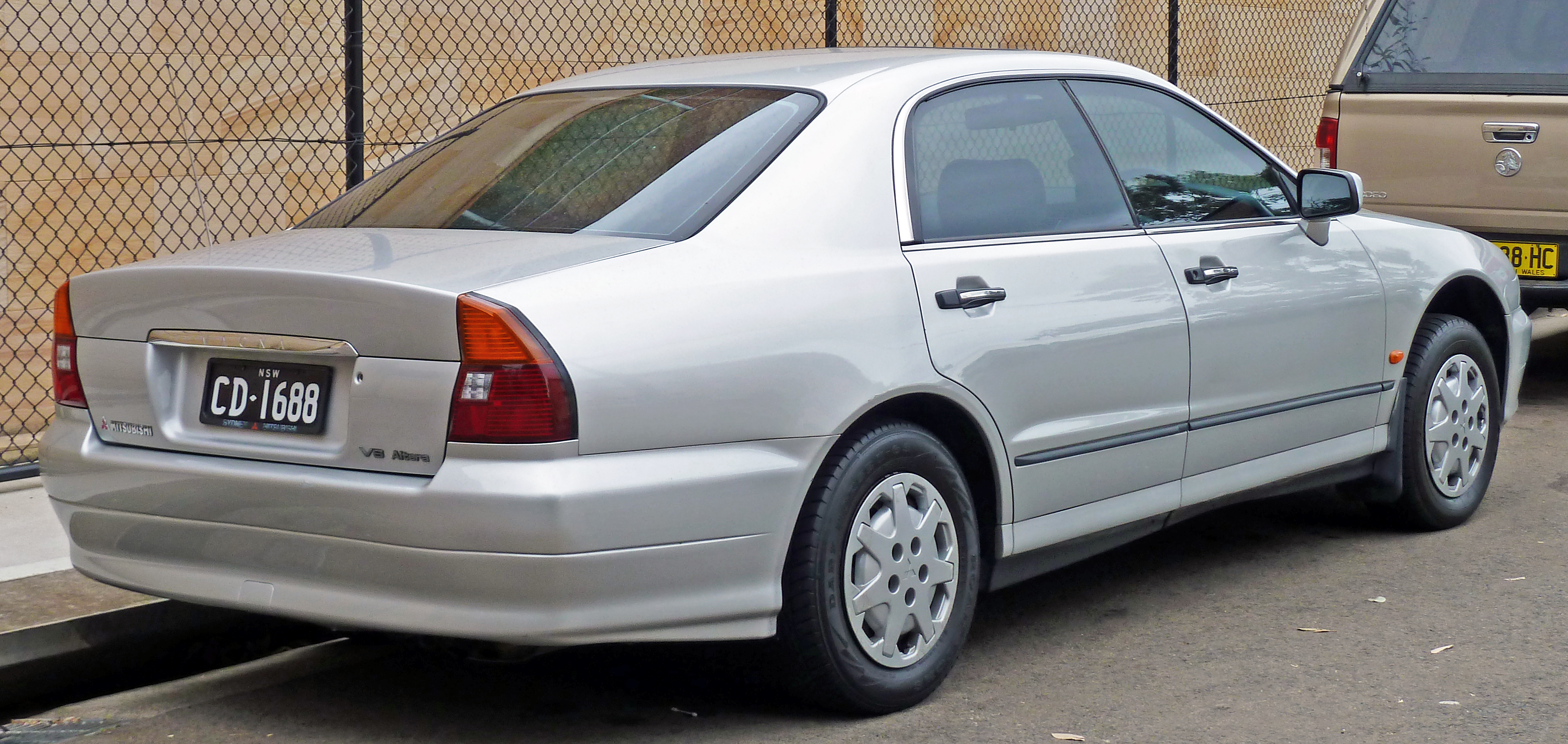
Magna Altera V6 sedan (TE)

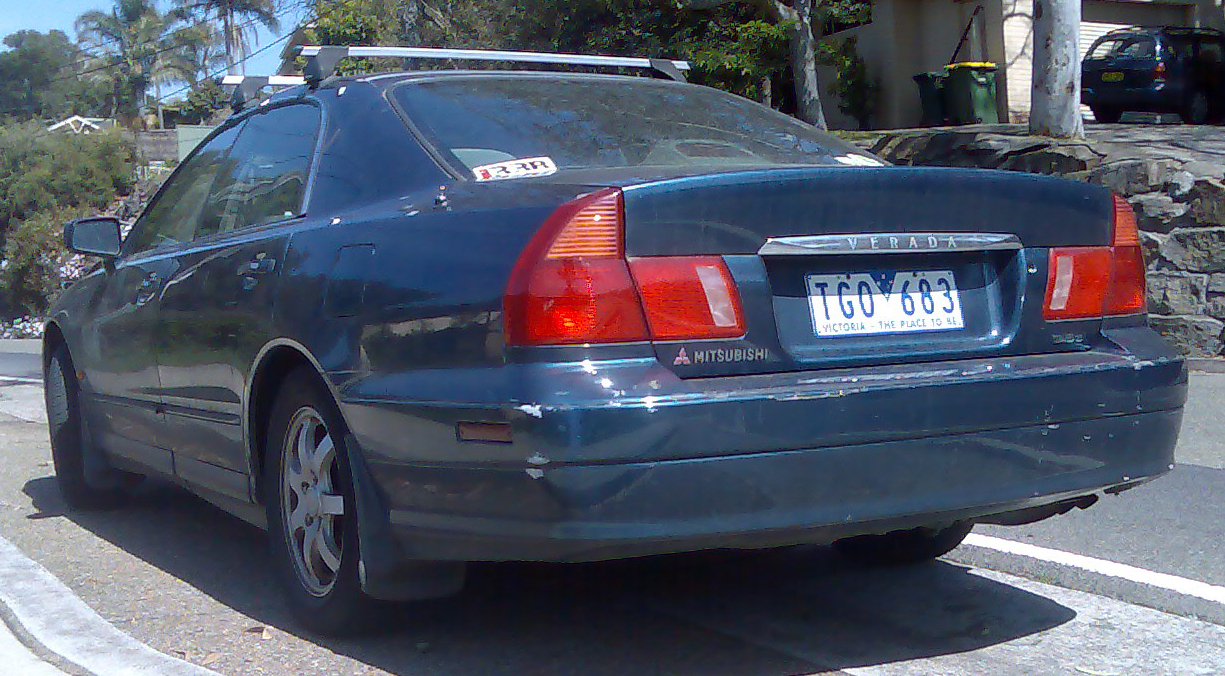
Verada Ei sedan (KE)

In April and July 1996, MMAL respectively released a new generation Magna and Verada, which were broadly based on the pillar-less Japanese second generation Diamante.

The cost of the Australian project was some A$500 million and both cars won the 1996 Wheels Car of the Year award, with judges praising the car's value for money.

As was the case with the second generation, the TE and KE series shared the same platform, which was codenamed "YR". Their bodies were bigger (10 mm or 0.4 in higher and longer than the TS series but close to the KS series) and stiffer (13 percent more) yet only marginally heavier (by less than 20 kilograms or 44 pounds) than before thanks to its greater aluminium construction. The new Magna and Verada also had coupe-like frameless windows plus slim centre/B-pillars, with increased front and rear legroom and boot space. The Verada was again distinguished by more luxurious fittings and longer front and rear bumper bars to meet US safety standards. Inside, unlike the Verada, Magna's cabin was dominated by dark grey trim that, along with the high waistline, caused some criticisms about a claustrophobic "bunker" effect.

The Magna's powerplants included, for the first time, a Japanese-imported 2.4-litre four-cylinder (codenamed 4G64-S4) with 90 percent new parts relative to the related engine fitted on the previous Magna. There were also new Australian-made V6 engines with a 3.0-litre capacity (codenamed 6G72) for the Magna and a 3.5-litre displacement for the Verada (codenamed 6G74). The V6 returned official city and highway fuel consumption figures of 10.5 L/100 km (22 mpg_{‑US}) and 6.6 L/100 km (36 mpg_{‑US}), respectively.

The initial models included the Executive and the Altera (previously, the SE), both available with a choice of either engine and four-speed automatic or five-speed manual transmissions. From October 1996, fully equipped Advance and Altera LS models (the latter, the equivalent of the previous Elite model) were added. The 2.4-litre four-cylinder engine produced 105 kW (141 hp) and 205 N⋅m (151 lb⋅ft), while the 3.0-litre V6 produced 140 kW (188 hp) and 255 N⋅m (188 lb⋅ft), claiming a markedly quicker 100 km/h (62 mph) sprint and improved 80 to 100 km/h (50 to 62 mph) acceleration times. The four-speed electronic "INVECS II" automatic transmission was new and could adapt to the driver's pattern of use and road conditions to select the optimum gear for any situation, thanks to "fuzzy-logic". Although the power-assisted rack and pinion mechanism had the same mounting points as the Diamante, the components were manufactured to MMAL's specifications in Australia, by TWR. Suspensions were independent (MacPherson struts) at the front, instead of the multi-link designs of the Diamante, which nevertheless donated its rear multi-link to the Australia sedan (while the wagon adopted a different and more compact design altogether). Brakes included discs all around (front ventilated) with the option of a Bosch 5.3 ABS. The braking system also included Australia's first "Banksia" parking brake (developed by PBR), some 10 to 20 percent lighter and cheaper than conventional systems at the time.

The Verada was available as an Ei or Xi model, only available with the 3.5-litre V6 (which produced 147 kW (197 hp) and 300 N⋅m (221 lb⋅ft)) mated to an automatic transmission. Its highest specification again formed the basis of MMAL's export programme, becoming the sole Diamante for all world markets except Japan, where a Japanese-built Diamante remained available. Mitsubishi planned to export 25,000 units per year to 18 countries. In its biggest market—the United States—the Diamante was positioned to compete in the "near luxury" segment. In New Zealand, the V3000 badge was retired and the new Diamante sold there consisted of rebadged Australian models of both the Magna and Verada, instead of Diamantes with exclusive specifications for all other world export markets.

The Executive was the entry-level model that featured: power steering, four-speaker sound system, power mirrors, remote boot and fuel filler release, central locking and an engine immobiliser. The Altera model, which was a mid-entry-level model, added: air-conditioning, power windows and cruise control. Options included: airbags for driver and passenger, ABS, a CD player and alloy wheels. Subsequent additions to the model range included the Advance (safety-package) and the Altera LS (mid-luxury package), which featured ABS, airbags, CD player and alloy wheels as standard.

The TE series was launched with an initial palette of eight colours. Four were carried over from the previous TS Magna (i.e. Paris White, Calypso Red, Arctic Blue, and Madeira (maroon)) and another four were newly introduced (i.e. Silverleaf (silver), Kashmir (light beige), Greenstone and Embassy (charcoal grey)). A short-lived Olive Green colour was made available late production in the TE/KE production and Atlantis Blue (dark sapphire blue pearl) was unique to the Verada.

The TE and KE series were the most aerodynamic car produced ever in Australia even compared to the VF Commodore or FG X Falcon, with an amazing drag coefficient of Cd=0.28. This achievement was due to a sweeping roofline (which, however, compromised rear headroom) and such things as "flag" external rear-view mirrors, fixed to independent door posts instead of being more traditionally mounted directly on the front door A-pillar triangle.

A wagon version was launched in March 1997, with a drag coefficient of Cd=0.33, but was quickly replaced by the TF series equivalent three months later.

=== TF / KF ===
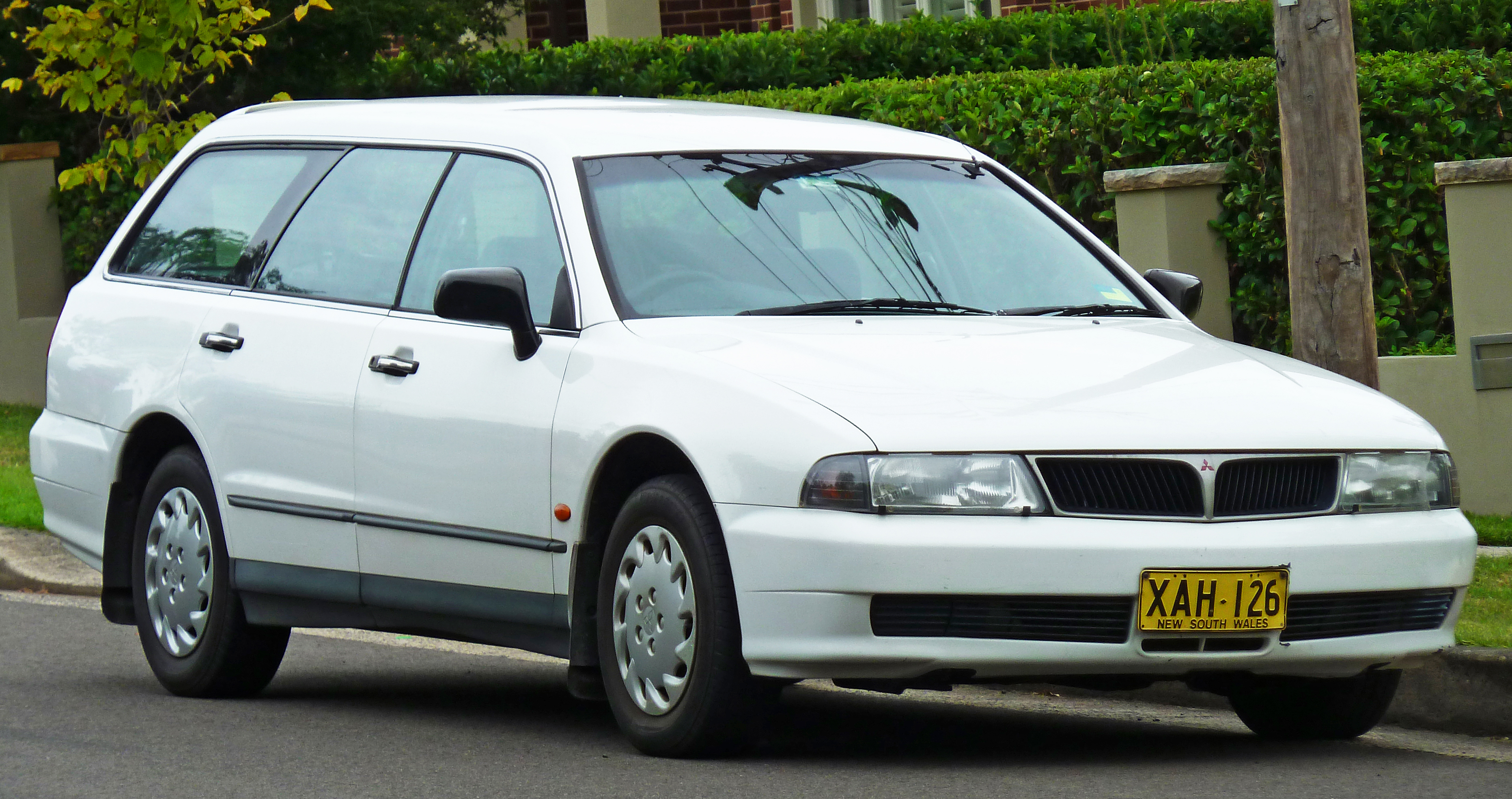

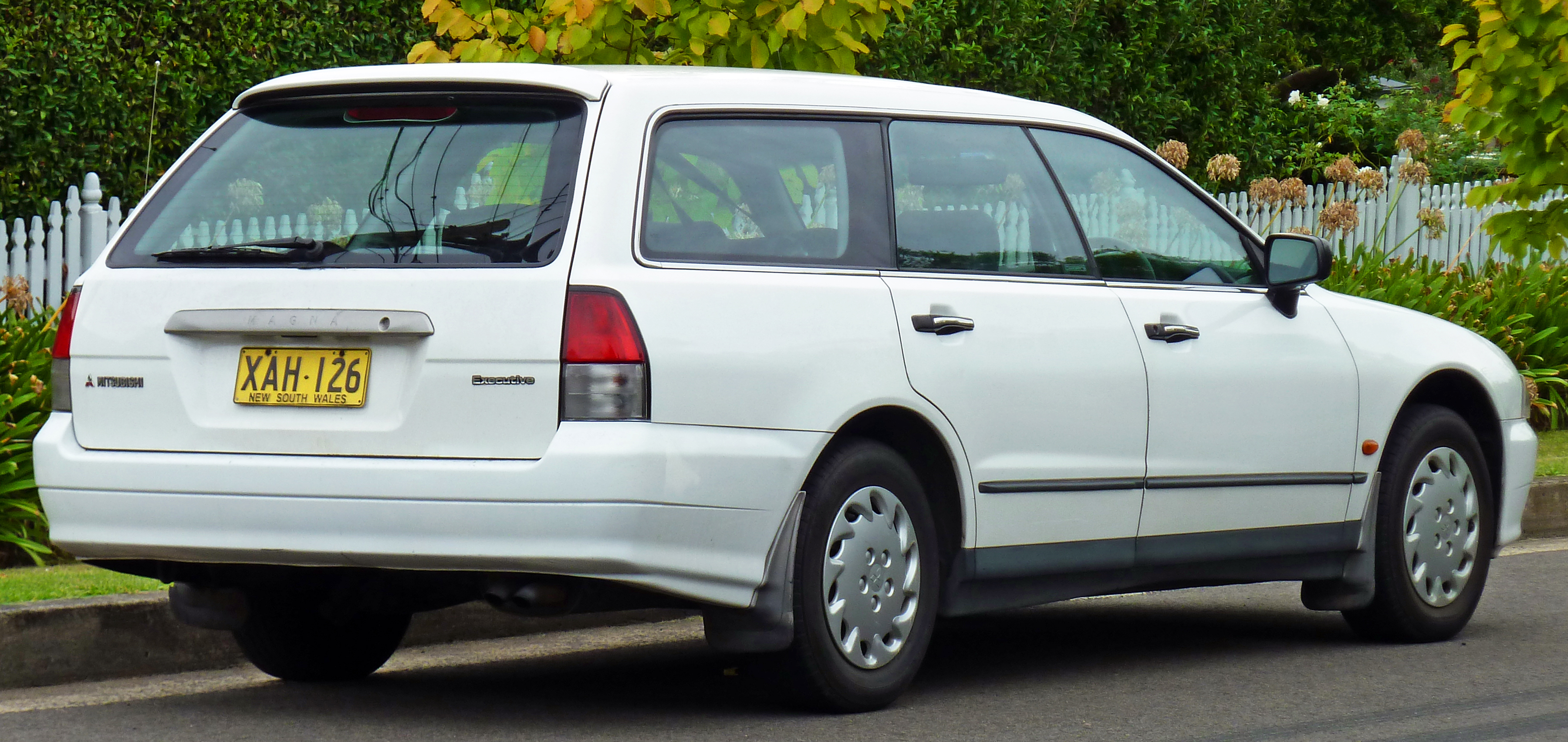
Magna Executive wagon (TF)

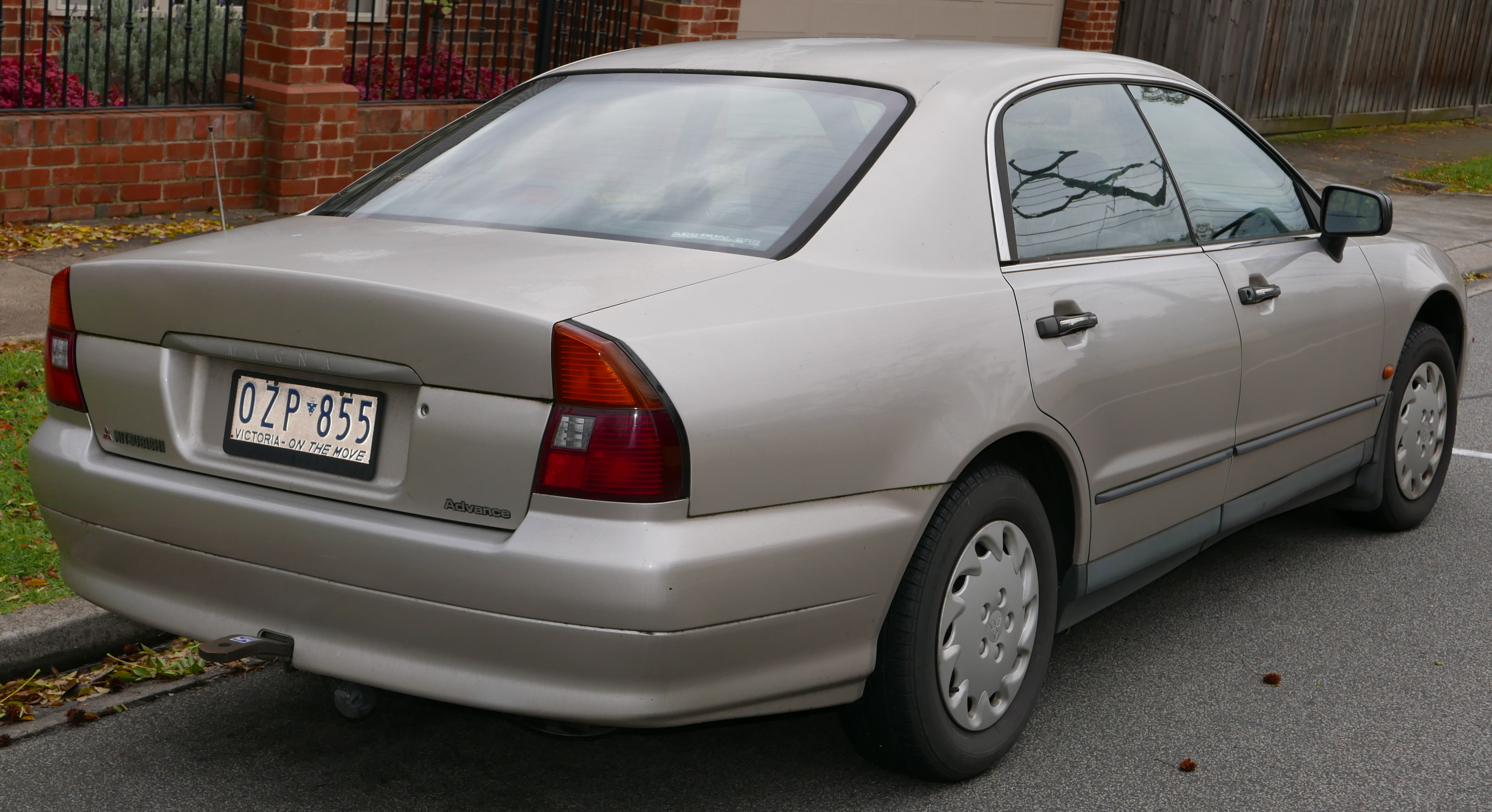
Magna Advance sedan (TF)

The TF/KF series was introduced in June 1997. Magna's range consisted of five models: Executive, Advance, Altera, Altera LS and Sports. The 2.4-litre four-cylinder engine was seen only in the Executive. These cars offered redesigned wheel covers, speed-limit alert and upgraded interior trims, which included cup holders. The Executive and Advance were identical in appearance but the Advance had a different interior trim and was fitted as standard with airbags and ABS. The full colour-coded Altera and Altera LS introduced power windows and several other options such as dual front airbags. Manual transmissions became only available on Executive, Advance, Solara and Sports. From June to August 1998, a limited edition Solara was introduced and it included all Advance features as standard, plus: alloy wheels, colour-coding, "Solara" badging on the rear doors and at the bottom right-hand side of the boot.

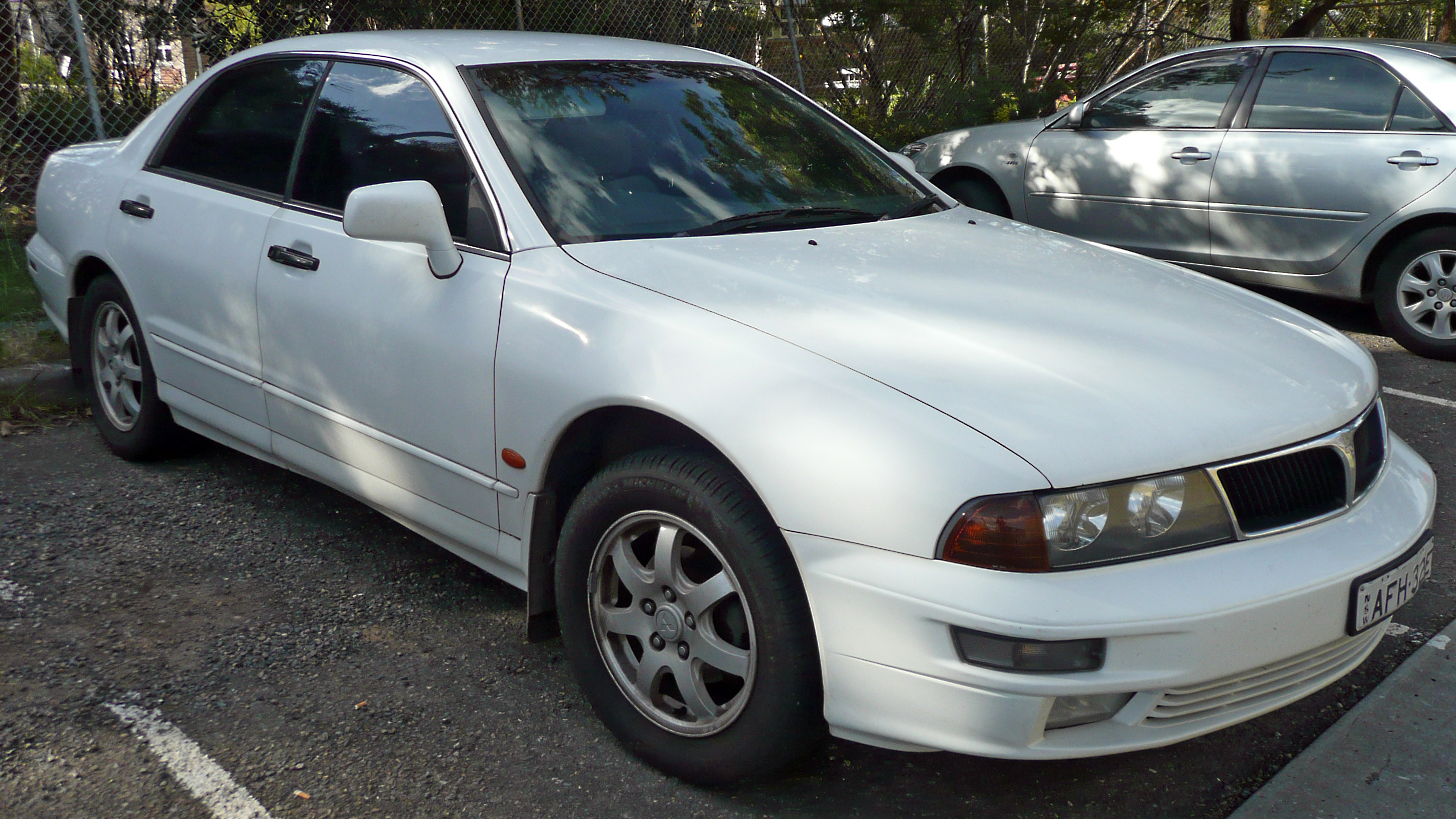
Verada Ei sedan (KF)

The Magna Sports was available in only four colours: Paris White, Calypso Red, Nautilus Blue (deep blue), and Frontier Green (deep green), the latter two colours being new to the TF series. This new model carried all the standard features of the Executive model on which it was based, plus a deck lid spoiler, red side strip, 16-inch alloy wheels (same as the Verada Ei, but polished), and unique interior trims such as a metal-style instrument cluster fascia. Its V6 was standard as on all Magnas, however, only the Sports could be optioned with a manumatic Tiptronic four-speed automatic transmission featuring for the first time on an Australian-built car, a manual shifting function (via a second transmission gate plane to the right of standard gear positions, with "push-forward" upshifts and "push-back" downshifts). The Sports had improved handling characteristics thanks to the addition of an 18 mm rear swaybar (a rear bar swaybar was not fitted to the standard Magna), 11 percent firmer rear springs, firmer upper control arm and trailing arm bushes, and suspension height lowered by 10 mm. Options included dual airbags and ABS. This specific model represented MMAL's foray into the Australian sporty family passenger car sector, as well as an initial and long overdue departure from the more conservative Japanese product planning. The Sports' production ceased after September 1998.

The 3.5-litre engine that powered the KF series Verada was identical to that fitted to the KE series. Its main changes, like the TF series Magna, included new wheel designs and cabin trim, revised colours and a specification adjustment – such as an over-speed warning device, cupholders and standard dual front airbags.

Several new colours (Cocoon White (pearl white), Astral Blue (metallic blue), Lugano Green (pearl blue/green) and Burra (pearl dark red/bronze)) were introduced during the later production of the TF series and the final unit built came out in December 1998.

About 60,000 TF Magna's were built and over 5,000 KF Verada's for Australian roads.

=== TH / KH ===
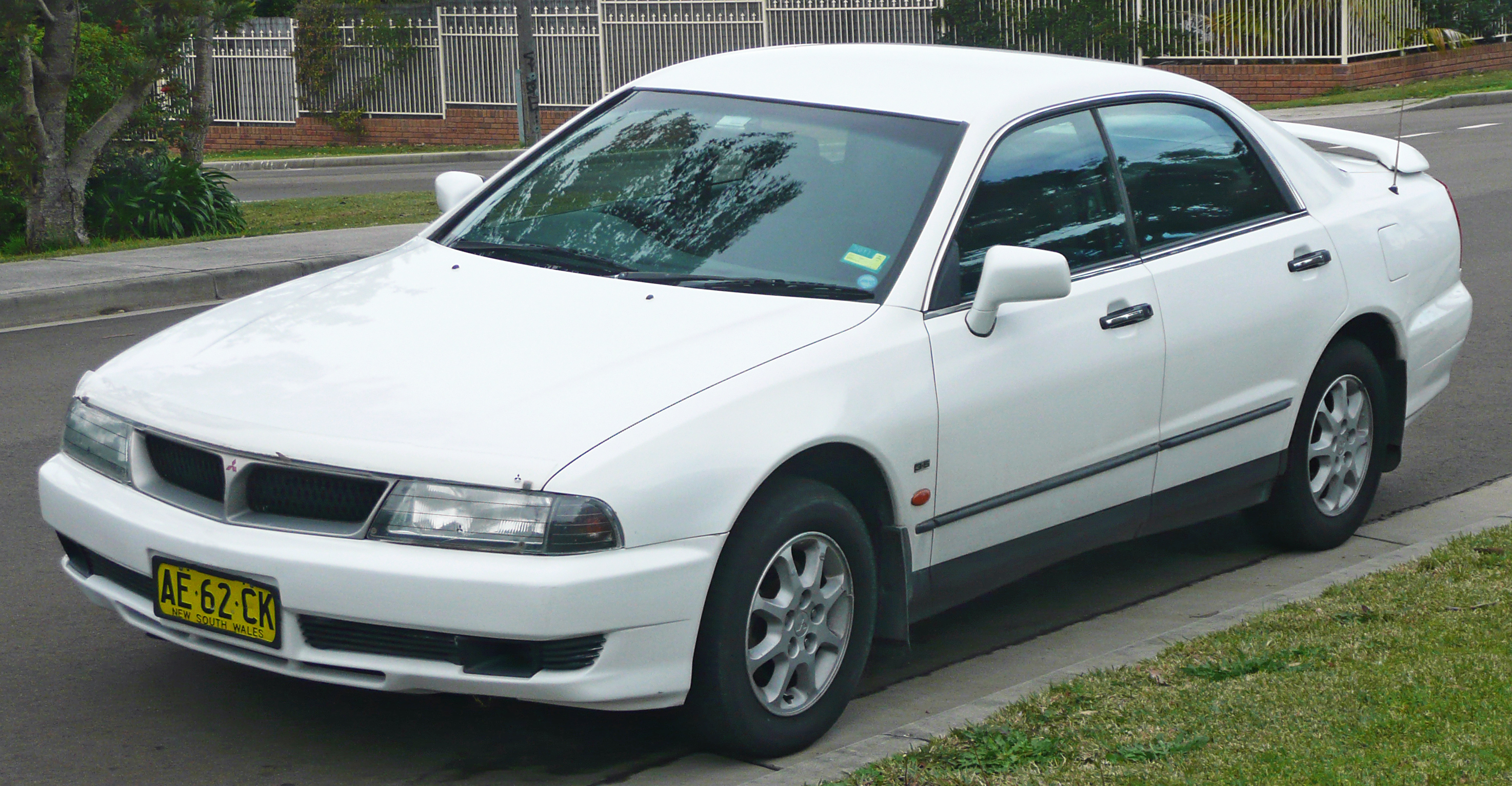
Magna Advance sedan (TH)

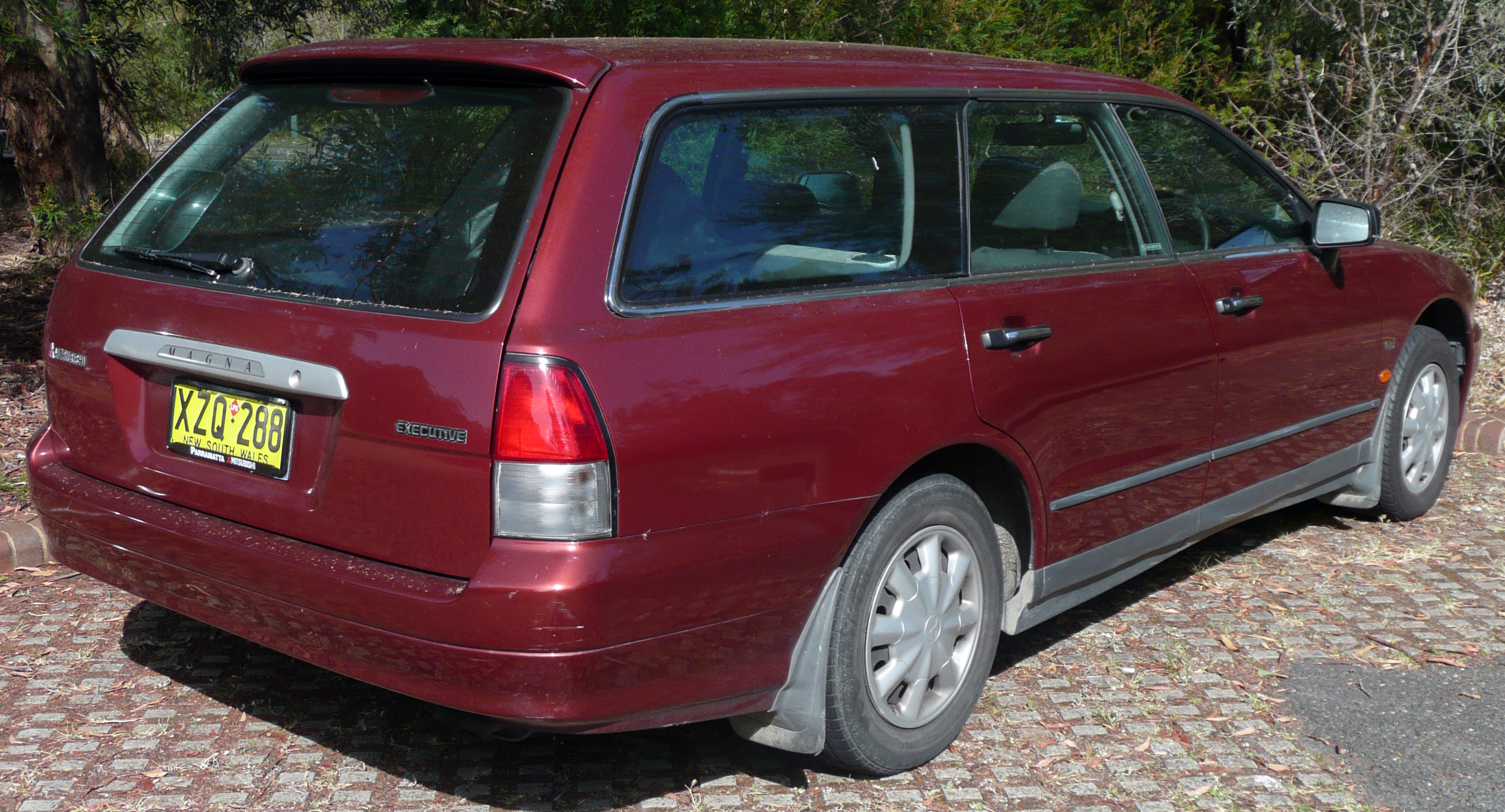
Magna Executive wagon (TH)

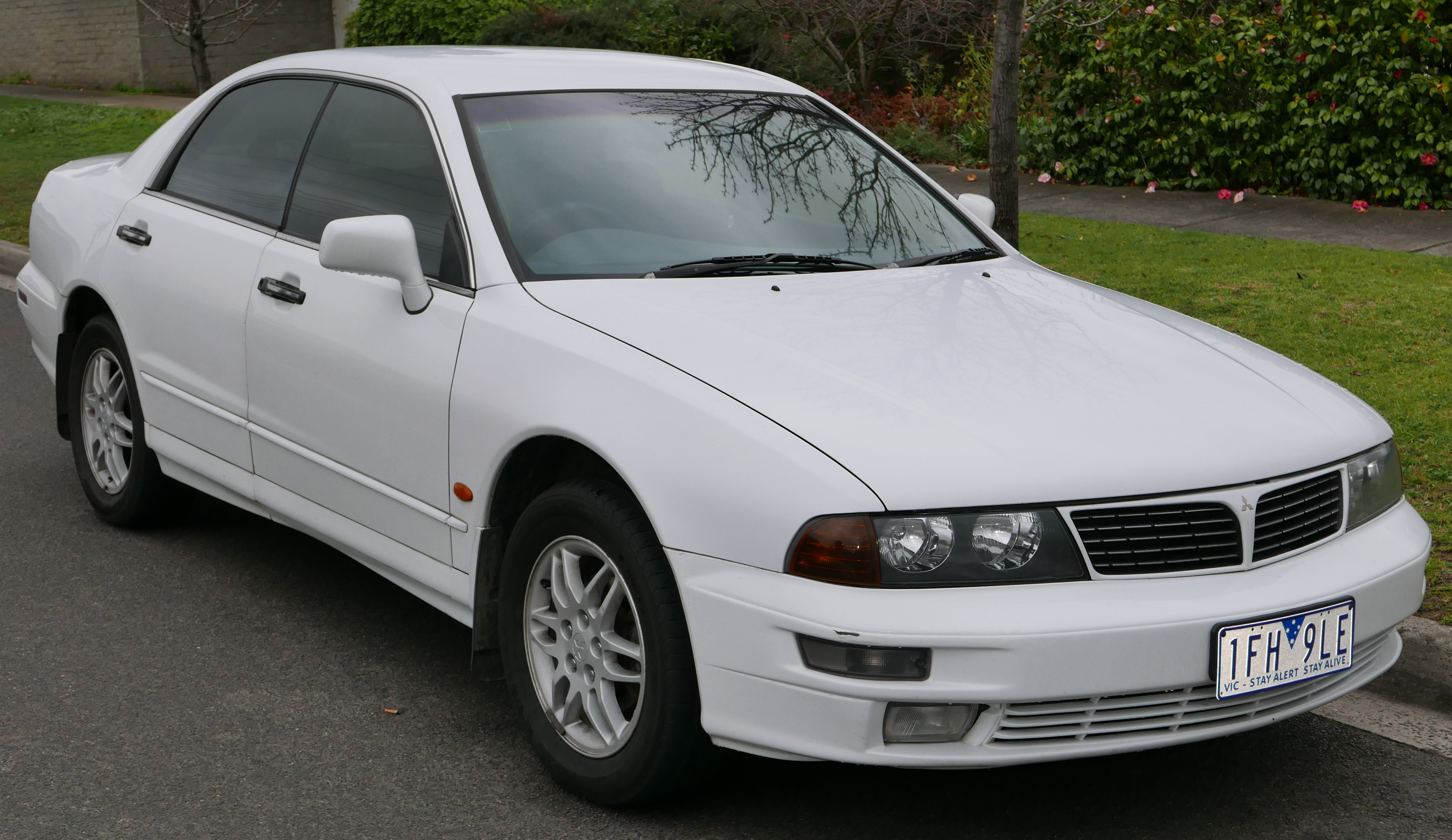

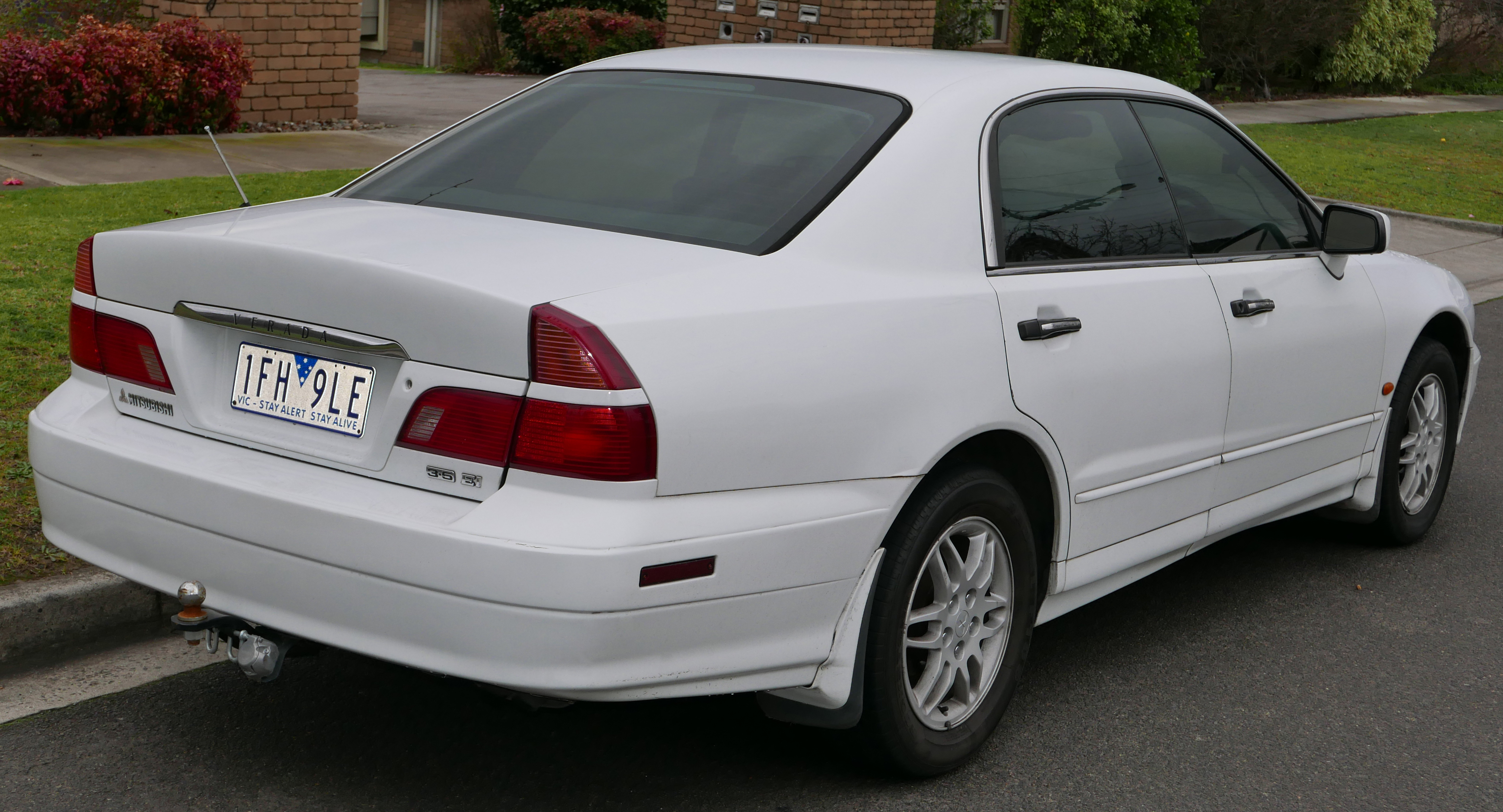
Verada Ei sedan (KH)

The TH series was launched in March 1999 with the earliest examples built in December 1998. The cost of this upgrade (including Verada models) reached A$12 million, which went towards increased availability of the 3.5-litre V6 engine and a matching manual transmission as well as specification and trim changes across the range.

On the engine front, in fact, due to slow sales and growing consumer preference for more powerful engines, Magna's imported four-cylinder was dropped. At this time, the 3.0-litre V6 became standard and Verada's 3.5-litre engine also became a Magna option. The 3.0-litre V6 was fitted only to the Executive, while all other models could be powered by the previous Verada's 3.5-litre V6 (optional on Executive).

Cosmetic changes included revisions to the basic design of the car, such as a more aggressive front grille, redesigned rear, revised interiors, redesigned wheel covers and alloy wheels. Air conditioning was made standard across the range. A number of colour changes also occurred: Calypso Red was replaced with Sienna Red, while Sable Black pearl (pearl black with green flakes) took the place of Embassy grey. Riversand, a new strong beige metallic colour, was also introduced in April 1999 as were Mawson White, a brighter more pure white (pictured right) and Pewter (metallic silver), which replaced Silverleaf. Island Blue and Glacier Green (aqua blue/green) were two other new colours used on the TH but are rare.

The TH and KH series claimed the honours of being the first Australian-made car with a four-channel ABS featuring an Electronic Brake-force Distribution (EBD) system—a Bosch 5.3 module. Another new key feature was an 8-function trip computer and integrated anti-theft alarm system. The model range included: Executive (manual and auto); Advance (manual and auto); Altera LS (auto) and Sports (manual and Sports Mode automatic).

MMAL also became the first Australian manufacturer to offer a traction control system labelled "TCL" (meaning, Trace Control Logic), which was switchable and initially available only on Magna Sports. A limited edition Solara was reintroduced later in 1999 as well as the V6 Si in April 2000. Altera LS was discontinued at the end of 1999, due to its closeness to the Verada Ei. The 1999 models lacked V6 badges but the 2000 models often featured these on the back lower right end of the boot lid. The last TH series production between May and June 2000, were 1000 Executive LS units (automatic only), which were similar to the discontinued Altera LS but without power windows, dual airbags and less colour-coding (e.g. unpainted black mirrors).

A Magna Sports participated in the Australian GT Production Car Championship, with varying successes, driven by MMAL engineer and privateer, Robert Chadwick. The vehicle featured a front limited-slip differential (LSD) later brought to production on the TJ series Magna Ralliart.

=== TJ / KJ ===
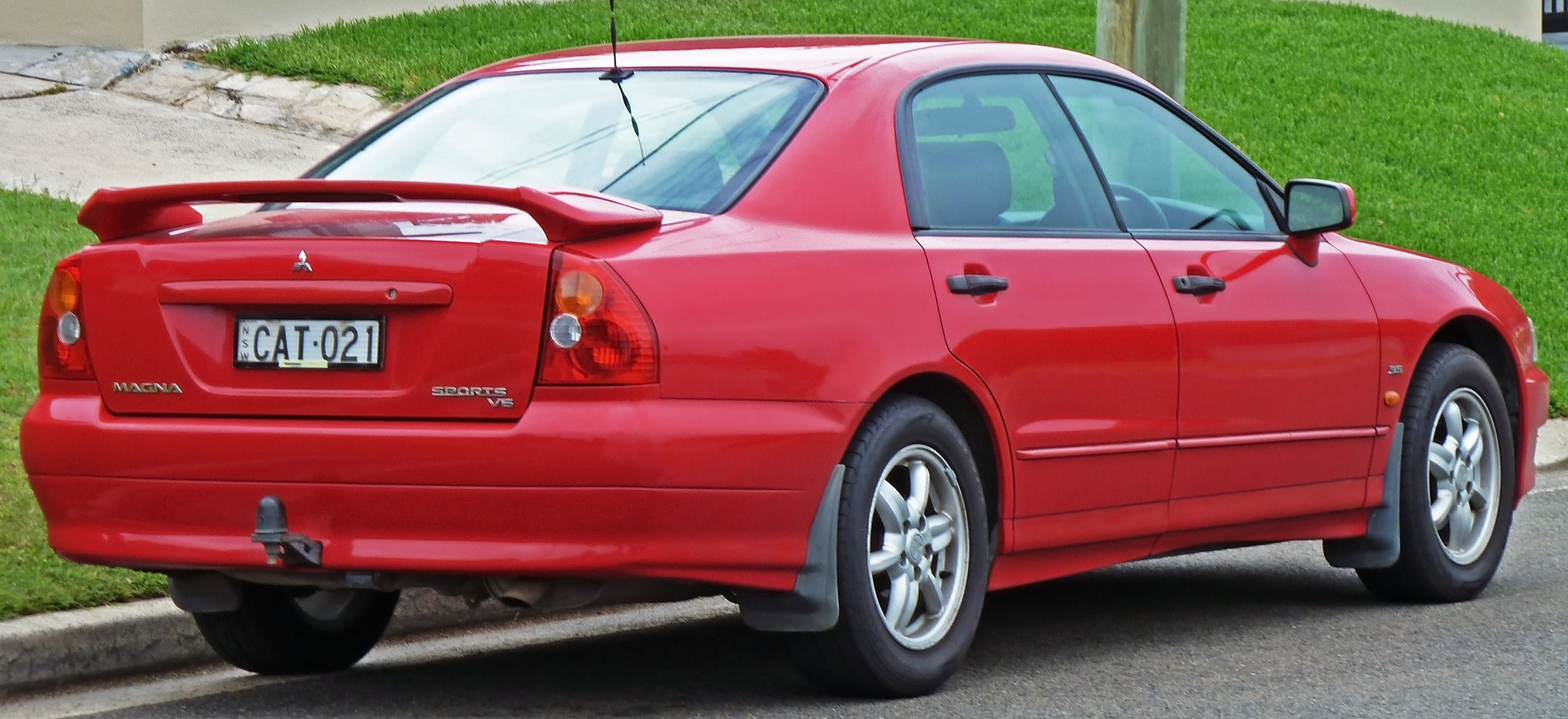
Magna Sports sedan (TJ MY02)

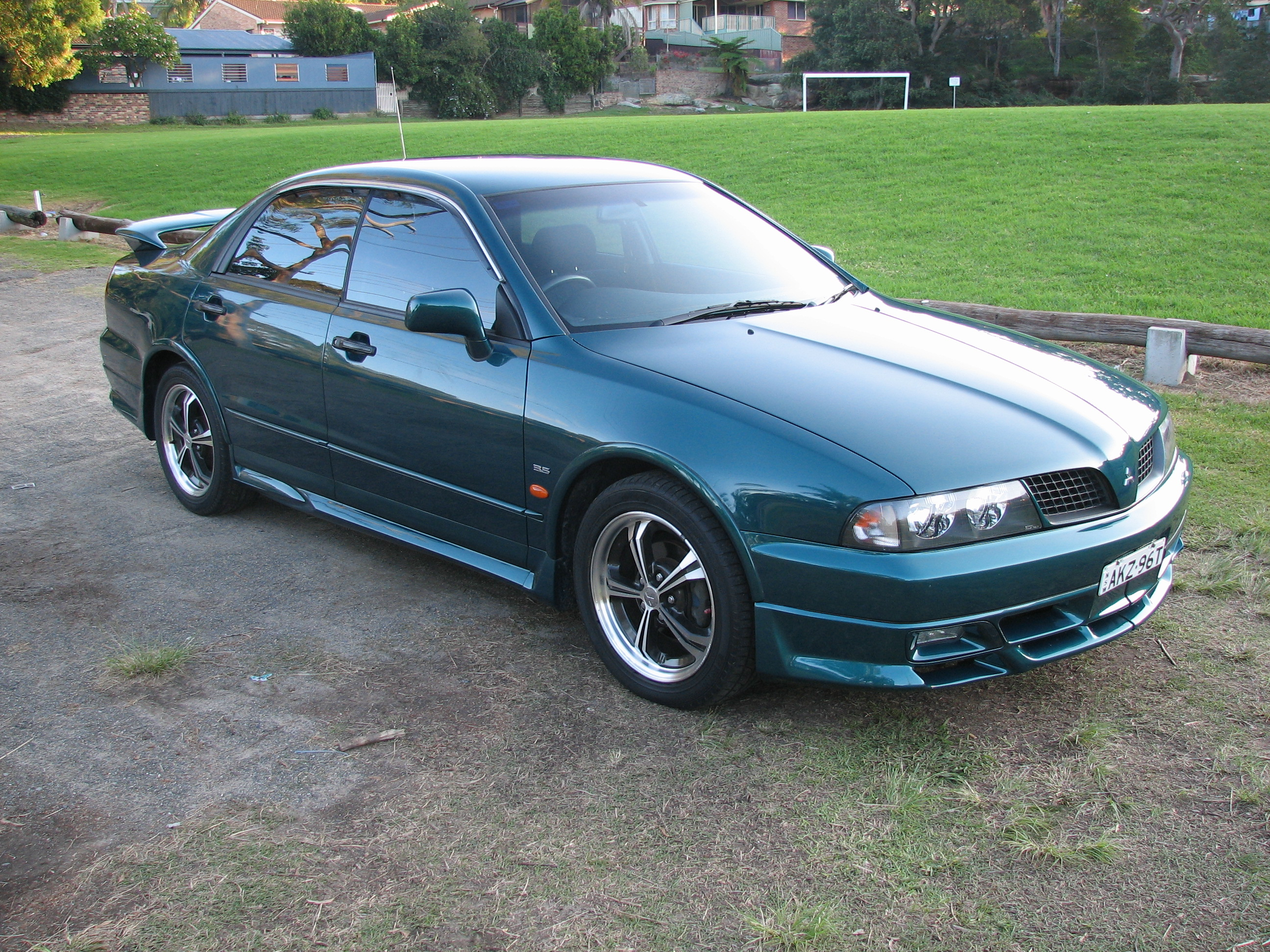
Magna VR-X sedan (TJ MY02)

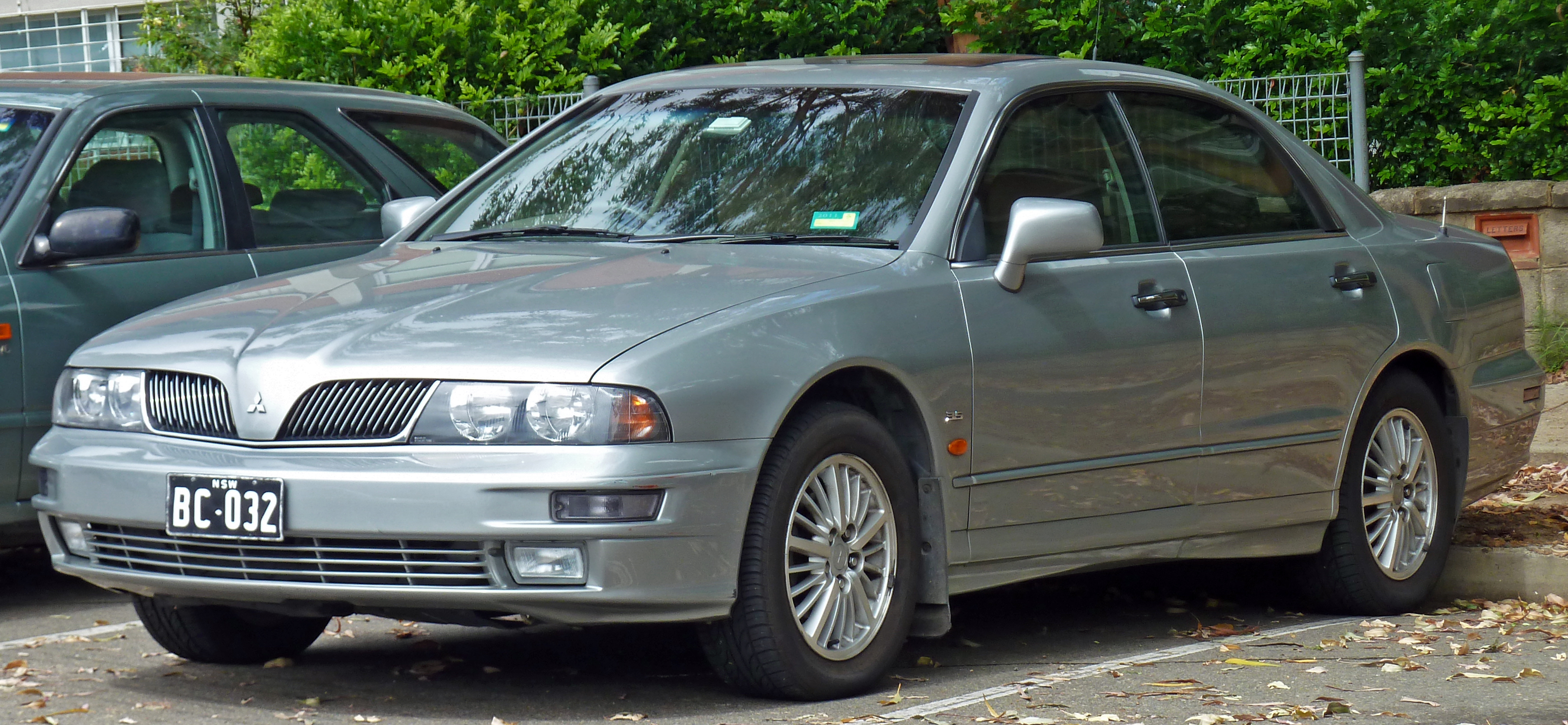
Verada Xi sedan (KJ Series 2)

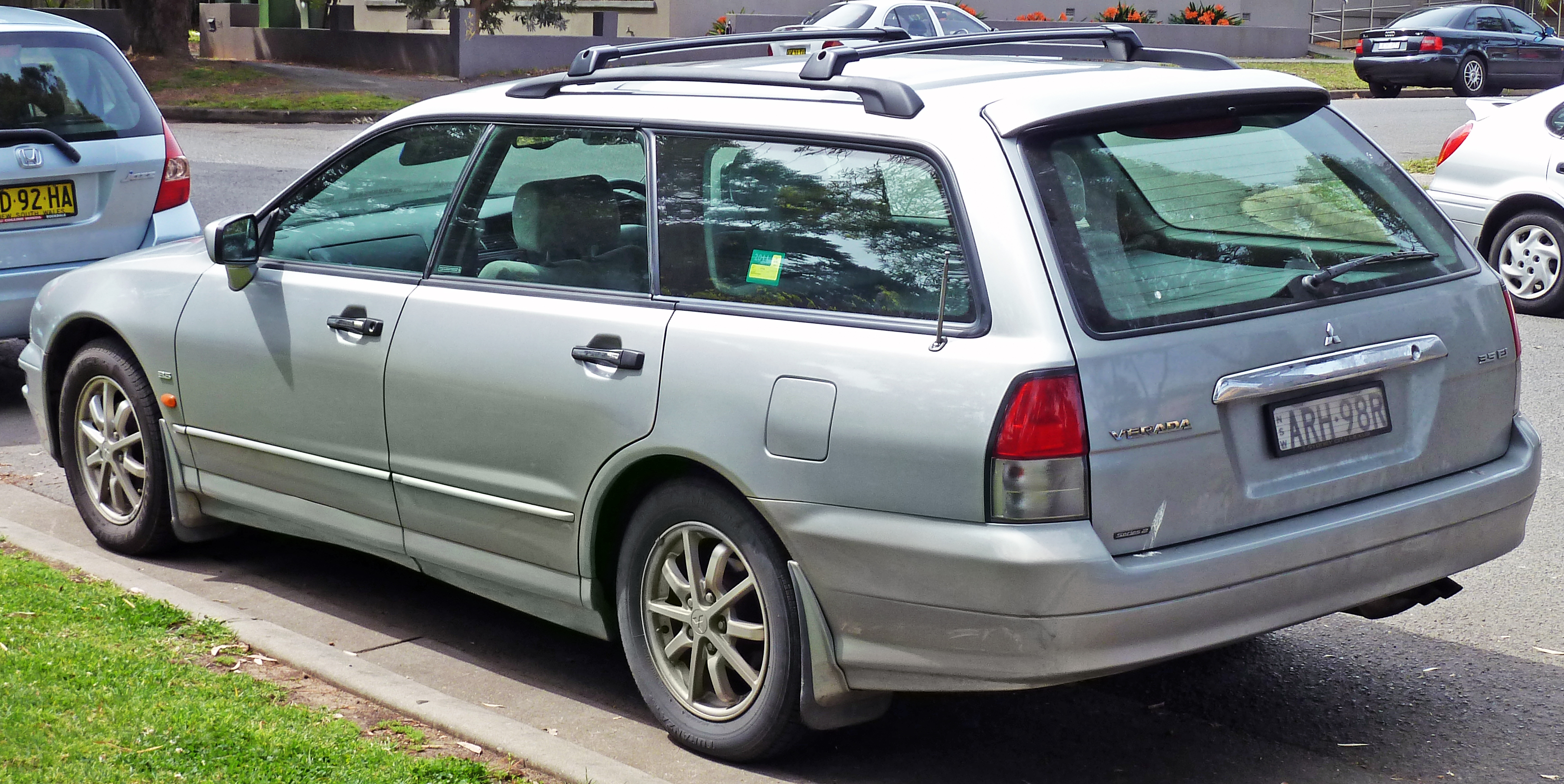
Verada Ei wagon (KJ Series 2)

With the launch of the TJ series in July 2000, Magna offered revised styling. The car's overall shape remained the same as the previous TE to TH series, except for a raised central section for the bonnet ending with a beak splitting the front grille, making some journalists coin the phrase "bird of prey". Magna Sports and the new VR-X model featured the same one-unit turn-light/double parabolic headlights as Verada. At the back, the boot-lid featured a recessed centre section and new tail light lenses with new-trend circular lit chambers. The cost of this upgrade was some A$30 million.

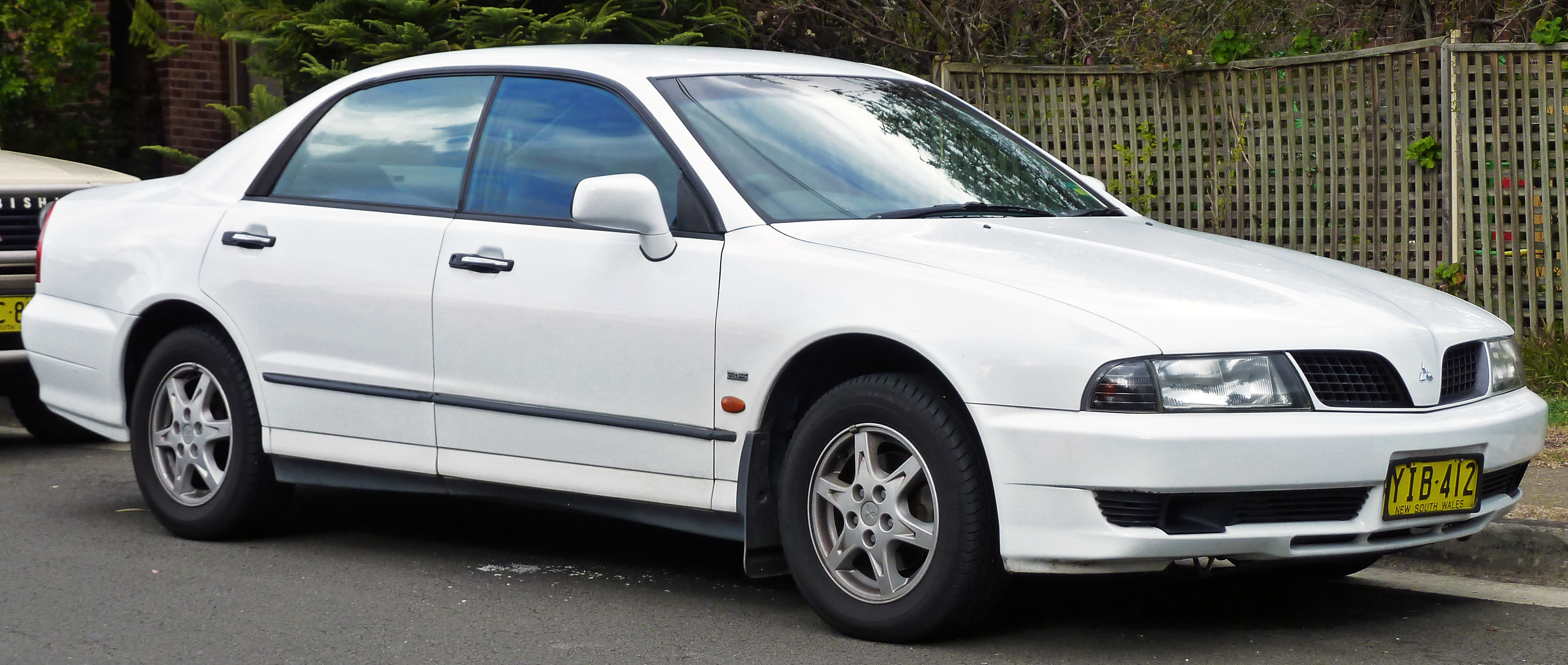
Magna Advance sedan (TJ Series 2)

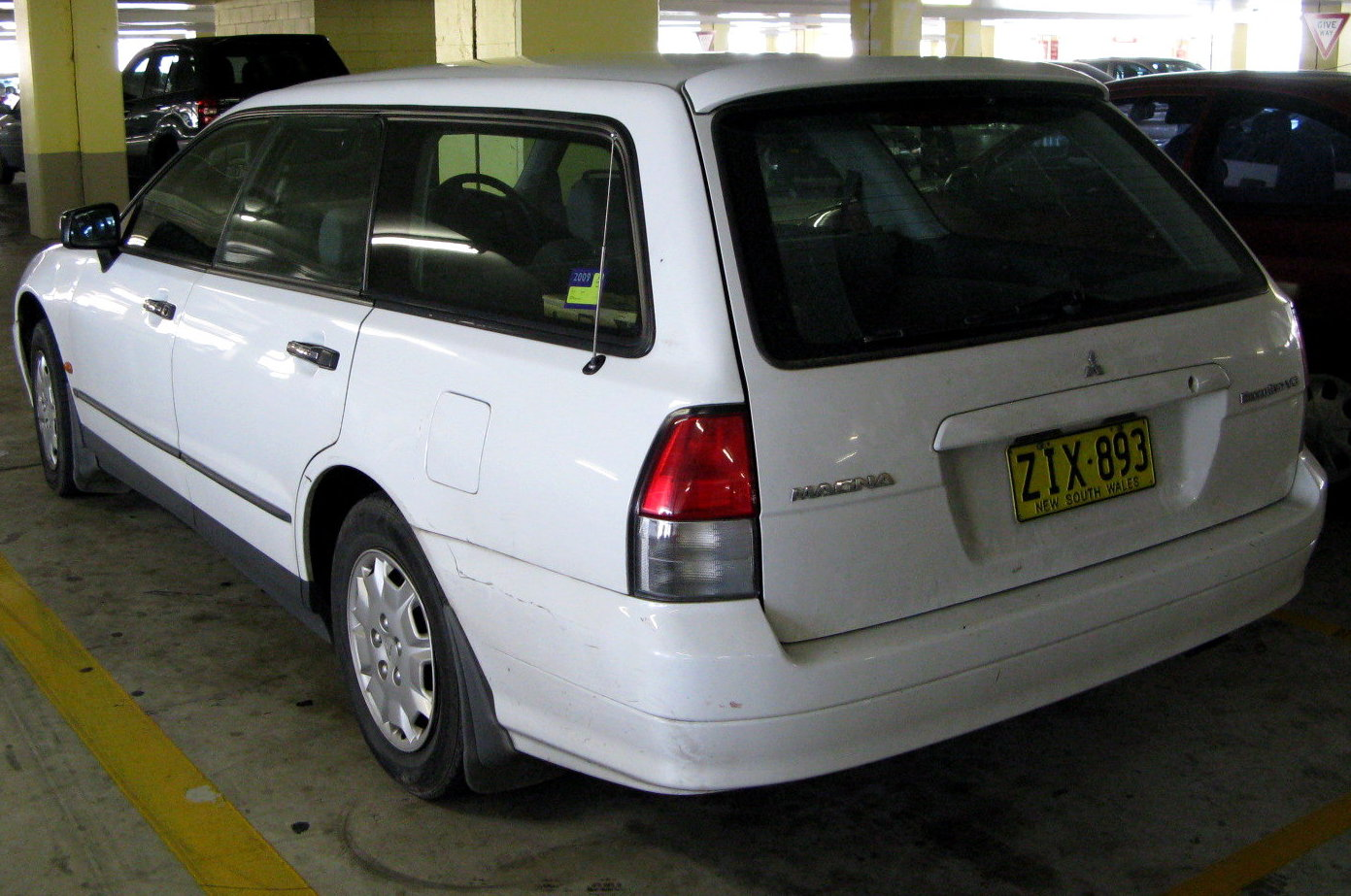
Magna Executive 3.0-litre wagon (TJ)

A new new-chromed Mitsubishi badge was also introduced, replacing the more traditional red triple diamonds. MMAL's proposal to use a black Mitsubishi badge to distinguish the Magna sports range was rejected by Japan's conservative management. Another external change in the TJ series was the replacement of the chrome-look window surround with a more modern black fitting (Verada sedans maintained the more luxurious chrome).

Several new colours were introduced including a very bright Island Blue (aqua) and Glacier Green (green aqua, both used on some previous TH series in 1999), which were discontinued after only a few months of production. In May 2001, a new darker Pacific Blue colour was introduced to replace the just mentioned two colours and Flame Red was also reintroduced to the range, mostly as the hero colour for the subsequent Ralliart model. Sapphire Blue and Daintree Green were added too and proved popular. Grey and beige interior options were made available to any exterior colour in the Executive/Advance, with grey otherwise the default, becoming the only option on the Series 2 given its greater sales popularity. Equipment levels increased in the TJ series with a driver's airbag and CD player now standard across the range.

The TJ series carried over the previous 140 kW (188 hp) 3.0-litre V6 (6G72) for the Executive models, which could now be upgraded with the optional 150 kW (201 hp) 3.5-litre V6 (6G74), otherwise fitted to all other models as standard. This resulted in Executive models with a 3.0-litre engines being extremely rare and, ultimately, dropped altogether in subsequent series.

Unlike 6G74-based engine available in Japan, the Australian-built V6 still had 24 valves but used a single overhead camshaft (SOHC) design instead of a more complex and costly double overhead cams (DOHC) design.

Sports and VR-X featured a larger 2.5-inch free flowing sports exhaust system, minor changes to the timing and duration of valve opening (both inlet and exhaust), which boosted power up to 163 kW (219 hp), resulting in a moderately sporty exhaust tone and class-leading performance amongst Australian-made sport sedans. Their engine was marketed as a "high output" unit to distinguish it from the mainstream 150 to 155 kW (201 to 208 hp) version fitted on all other Magnas and Veradas.

At launch, the model range of the TJ and KJ series comprised: the Magna Executive, Magna Advance sedan and wagon, Magna Sports sedan, Magna VR-X sedan, Verada Ei sedan and wagon, and Verada Xi sedan.

The Magna Sports featured full exterior colour coding, six-spoke 16x6-inch alloy wheels, improved suspension and swaybars and a deck lid spoiler shared with the Magna VR-X. The mechanically similar VR-X shared these features, but also had aggressively styled front and rear bumper spoiler extensions, wheel arch extensions, side skirts and large diameter round chrome exhaust tip. Inside, the Sports and VR-X also shared white instrument cluster dials, sports fabric seat trim and front seat backrests embroidered with the respective models' name. The automatic VR-X also had a chrome gear gate inherited from the Verada. The subsequent and rare Magna Sports wagon (produced only with the TJ series) was fitted with a full bodykit featuring silver accents, unlike the Sports sedan that featured only had a deck lid spoiler.

Automatic Sports and VR-X (as well as Verada) models were now fitted with a five-speed Tiptronic transmission with "TCL" traction control system, making Mitsubishi the first Australian manufacturer to go beyond the then common four-speeds. Meanwhile, manual transmissions were dropped from the wagons, which gained standard automatic transmissions.

In October 2000, MMAL offered a limited-run Magna Solara, which was based on the Advance. Inside it featured a four-disc in-dash CD player, while externally it was distinguished by 15-inch "Manta" alloy wheels as standard, two-tone paint finish and body-coloured exterior mirrors, front grille and door side mouldings.

The TJ series was the subject of a number of rolling updates, beginning in May 2001 spearheaded by an upgraded VR-X range, followed by that of September 2001 affecting all models including the Verada range (officially known as the MY02 series) and culminating with the TJ and KJ Series 2 in July 2002. In 2002 and 2003, the TJ series was also bolstered by the Magna Ralliart and by the Magna and Verada AWD range, respectively. With the KJ Series 2 update, MMAL launched the limited-run Verada GTV, which used drivetrain components of the Magna Sports and VR-X. This subsequently became a permanent model rebadged as the Verada GTVi from March 2003.

Total production of the TJ and KJ series as at the end of 2001, reached 43,492 units with 19,215 exported to the US, New Zealand, Puerto Rico and the Middle East (where Magna also ended up served as an Iraqi police patrol cars). The most notable award won by this series was the Diamante's title of New Zealand's Car of the Year for "Best Large Car".

In 2001, a Magna TJ Sports won Class D of the GT Production Showroom Showdown Race at Bathurst and a V8-powered RWD Magna contested the V8 Future Touring class of the 2000–01 Australian Super Touring Championship. The Magna VR-X was voted the best-value performance car on the Australian market by a News Limited panel of motoring journalists.

May 2001 update

From May 2001, coinciding with the launch of the Magna VR-X Limited Edition, MMAL distanced all VR-X models from the Sports by equipping the former with unique five-spoke 17x7-inch alloy wheels shod with 225/50 Bridgestone performance tyres. Furthermore, the suspension was modified with higher rate springs, revised shock absorbers and a new front sway bar. Cosmetically, both the Magna Sports and VR-X were fitted with black brake callipers, black interior door handles, black inserts in the exterior door handles, and revised headlight units now featuring clear turn bezels (as opposed to the original amber).

Magna VR-X Limited Edition

With build and wholesale between May and June 2001, this vehicle was marketed as the "VRX-tra". It featured the above exterior upgrades plus interior upgrades that were part of a "Leather Pack" offered in two parts. The optional "Pack 1" included:

- Unique black fabric/Howe leather trim with "VR-X" embroidered front seats in either blue or red with matching door panels, depending on exterior paint (i.e. blue with Pacific Blue, Sapphire Blue and Mawson White paint; red with Sienna Red, Pewter and Sable (black))
- Colour-coordinated instrument cluster (blue or red with "VR-X" inscribed rev counter)
- Two-tone black leather wrapped steering wheel with perforated silver inserts (which later became an optional accessory for all models)
- Silver panels for the centre console
- Verada-sourced fittings such as upgraded eight-speaker sound system with power antenna and in-dash four-CD stacker plus upgraded trip computer with dual readout.

The optional "Pack 2" consisted of all "Pack 1" features plus the Verada's electric sunroof with front map and C-pillar lamps. In all, MMAL built 175 of these models, of which 54 were fitted with the five-speed automatic and a sunroof.

August 2001 update

As part of this update, officially known as the TJ MY02 series, side impact bars previously fitted only to export models were also introduced for Australian market cars, and the front doors now featured energy absorbing material. The Magna Executive received ABS and power windows as standard, while the Advance, Sports and VR-X were each fitted with a six speaker sound system (up from four), automatic climate control, front map lamps, glove box lamp and power antenna. The Verada Xi's electric sunroof with front map lamps and C pillar courtesy lamps was now optional on all models. The Sports was further distanced from the VR-X by no longer sharing the same boot lid spoiler, but a smaller version (which became another optional accessory across the Magna range, and was fitted as standard on subsequent limited-run models, the Verada GTV and Diamante VR-X). Power for the standard (non "high output") 3.5-litre V6 engine increased to 155 kW (208 hp) thanks to a higher compression ratio and a Karman Vortex airflow meter. The instrument cluster now had an integrated digital odometer and trip meter, as opposed to the previous analogue setup. The above engine power increase also interested the Verada range. Moreover, the Ei was now fitted with a new chrome grille, while both the Ei and Xi received new design alloy-wheels and illuminated vanity mirrors. With this update all cars now had clear front turn bezels.

A limited-run Magna V6 Si, based on the Executive sedan, launched in September 2001. Its main features included by 16-inch alloy wheels, cruise control and power windows as standard. Externally, it had the new Sports' boot lid spoiler and body-coloured grille, side mouldings, splash protectors, air dam and door mirrors.

Finally, MMAL also released a further and final 95 leather packs for the VR-X, produced in November 2001.

In March 2002, MMAL also launched the limited-run Magna Commonwealth Games edition. Based on the Executive sedan, it was further equipped with a front passenger airbag, six-disc CD player, cruise control, floor mats and power antenna. Externally, it has 16-inch alloy wheels, "Commonwealth Games" badging and body-coloured features as on V6 Si.

Magna Sports wagon and Ralliart

MMAL's push to scroll off perceptions of conservatism lead to the showcasing of two prototypes at the 2001 Sydney Motor Show: a Magna Ralliart sedan and Magna Sports wagon. The latter was a Magna wagon with Sports/VR-X drivetrain, with a dark purple ChromaFlair exterior and interior centre console, full bodykit accented in silver, lowered suspension and aftermarket 17-inch ROH Adrenalin alloy wheels. It was launched two months later with a more conventional interior and standard 16-inch alloy wheels of the Magna Sports sedan.

The Ralliart concept in sedan form only, was a further development of the VR-X and the most powerful Magna ever designed to leverage off Mitsubishi's World Rally Championship exploits. In fact, its overall styling was based on the legendary Mitsubishi Lancer Evolution range, in particular the front bumper bar (void of any fog lights) and its bi-plane deck lid spoiler inspired by the limited edition Lancer Evolution VI TME (the rest of the body kit included carry-over VR-X wheel arch extensions plus unique side skirts and squared-off chrome exhaust tip). Among other things, in prototype form, Magna Ralliart was said to feature AWD, Supercharged, Recaro front seats, MOMO steering wheel and gear levers as part of a loud black and bright red interior. 500 individually numbered Ralliart models had been planned.

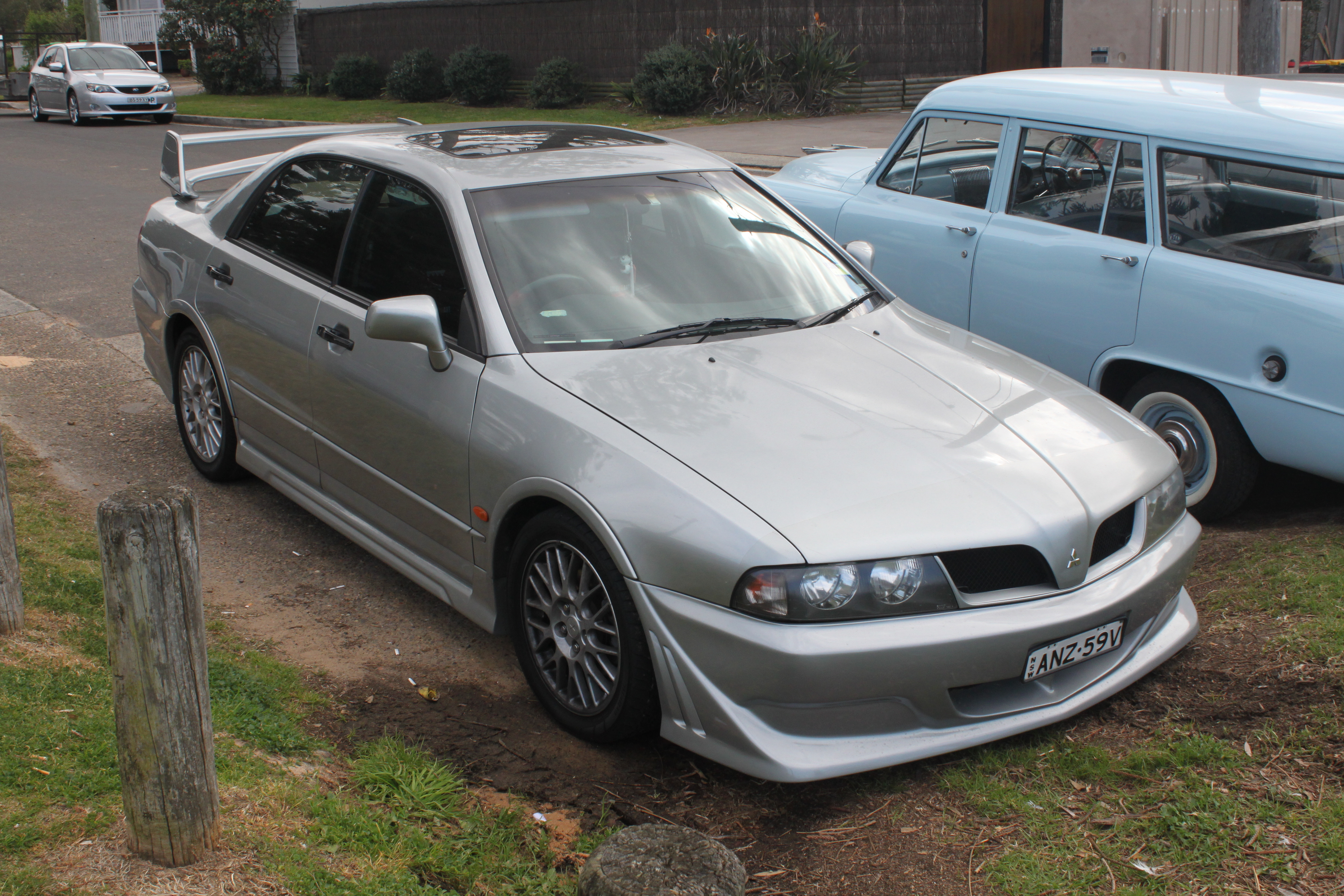

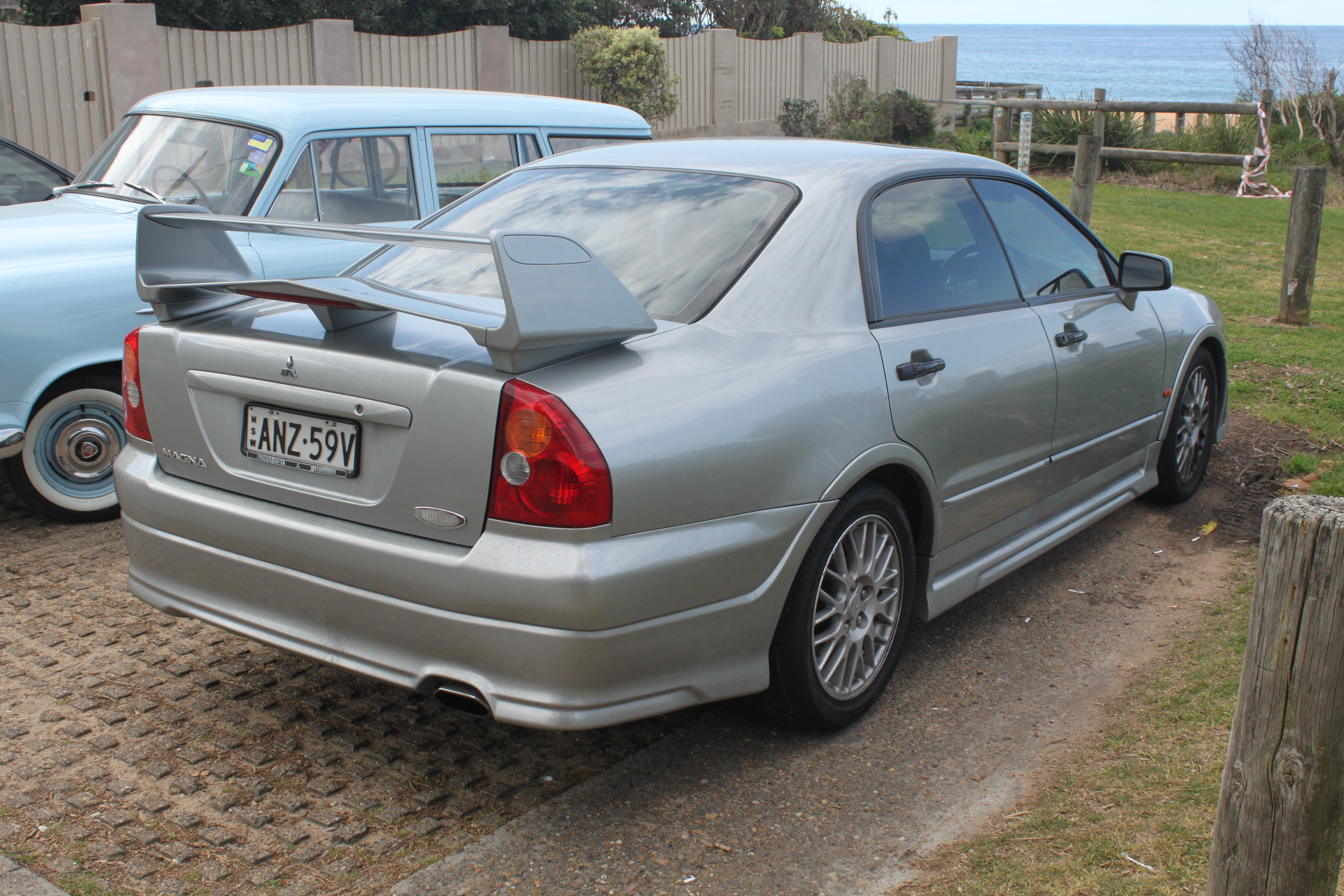
Magna Ralliart sedan (TJ), with optional sunroof

Due to budget constraints, however, the Ralliart (codenamed "TJ0R42") was brought to market in February 2002 still as an individually numbered vehicle, but only with a FWD platform and with less third party-sourced fittings. In fact, the front seats ended up being the standard Mitsubishi-designed Magna seats, but with revised side bolsters; the standard Magna's steering wheel and gear levers were retained, although the former was leather wrapped (black and red) in Italy by MOMO; the red-only instrument cluster dials (but with a "Ralliart" inscribed rev counter) and silver interior trims for the centre console and tunnel were sourced from the VR-X Limited Edition (without the Verada-sourced chrome gear plate for the automatic fitted to the VR-X). The sound system was a complete upgrade, however, being a 14-speaker Fujitsu Ten Eclipse tuner with CD player and remote control. This car also became the first local Mitsubishi product to offer datadot paint technology.

Mechanically, the 240 km/h (150 mph) speed-limited Ralliart (compared to 210 km/h or 130 mph for the Sports/VR-X) featured 17x7-inch Enkei premium alloy wheels shod with Pirelli performance tyres (instead of locally sourced Bridgestone tyres), and Koni suspension dampers (tuned by Mitsubishi and optimised with the local Koni agent, Toperformance) with similar same spring rates and 22 mm front, 18 mm rear anti-roll bars as the Magna Sports/VR-X, new power steering pump to increase weight and feedback, upsized brake disks from the Mitsubishi Diamante AWD and revised fuel tank to prevent starvation during high speed manoeuvres. The 294 mm front ventilated discs and 284 mm rear ventilated discs featured harder material and were 18 mm and 26 mm bigger than other Magna models, which have solid rear discs. Front twin-piston and rear single-piston callipers provided 26 and 32 percent more pad area, front pads sourced from Japan and rear pads from Australia, featuring the same friction material as the VR-X.

The engine was a reworked version of the 6G74 design fitted to Magna Sports and VR-X, but now generating 180 kW (241 hp) at 5,500 rpm thanks to a more aggressive cam profile, modified head and combustion chamber (compression ratio from the Sports/VR-X's 9.0:1 to 9.4:1), remapped ECU and a modified Magna VR-X exhaust system – featuring stainless-steel extractors by HM Headers (the latter on their own contributing to a power boost of only 2–3 kW) and larger muffler in the centre pipe (to improve mid- and high-rev exhaust note). Ralliart was available with either a five-speed manual or five-speed automatic transmission. A sunroof was the only option, Leather was offered as an option to company owned cars. The hardware for the automatic transmission was effectively lifted from Sports/VR-X models, in that it featured the same "TCL" traction control unit (instead of the LSD exclusive to the manual Ralliart, from the Mitsubishi FTO GPX) but with altered shift patterns.

TJ and KJ Series 2

Released in July 2002, these series (also known as TJ II and KJ II) comprised further and final incremental updates until the launch of the redesigned TL and KL series. Tiptronic was introduced to the four-speed automatic for the Executive and Advance models—making this function standard on all Magna automatics. Executive and Advance also gained new wheel trims, new grey-only interior trim and body-coloured grille surrounds. The 3.0-litre V6 engine for the Executive was dropped in favour of the 3.5-litre version.

The KJ Series 2 Verada also saw the introduction of Tiptronic to their five-speed automatic transmissions, whereas inside, there were a new instrument cluster, two-tone black/slate or black/sandstone colour schemes and chrome gearshift surrounds. The Ei gained a power adjustable driver's seat, while the Xi also featured with a power adjustable front passenger seat and Nardi wood gearshift knob. The range was expanded with the arrival of the limited-edition GTV. Specifically, this Verada was powered by the 3.5-litre "high output" V6 engine of the Magna Sports and VR-X, the upgraded VR-X sports suspension and black brake callipers, new design 17-inch alloy wheels shod with 225/50 Bridgestone tyres, the Sports' boot lid spoiler and rear muffler, and unique interior fittings comprising an eight-speak sound system with a four-disc in-dash CD player, satellite navigation, black leather seats with perforated inserts, black leather door inserts and console lid, and a Nardi wood steering wheel and gear knob. This model became a permanent range fixture from March 2003, when it was rebadged GTVi.

In December 2002, the TJ and KJ Series 2 range was further expanded by the AWD range, fitted with Mitsubishi's locally developed "Quadtec", as detailed below.

In April 2003, MMAL also launched an Executive and Advance range with a dedicated LPG system, available only with an automatic transmission. These models became the very first Magnas with this factory-fitted option, powered by a modified 3.5-litre V6 engines delivering a decreased maximum power of 143 kW (192 hp) at 5000 rpm and maximum torque of 296 N⋅m (218 lb⋅ft) at 4000 rpm. Luggage capacity also decreased from 460 to 325 litres. The total development cost was A$1.8 million.

In November 2002, a Magna Limited Edition (also known as the "LE") was the final special edition model launched to boost sales of the TJ series. It was, essentially, a 4-speed automatic transmission Executive that featured the Verada Ei's full leather trim (seats, door inserts and steering wheel), front parabolic headlights (of the original KJ series with amber turning lights), cruise control, 16-inch alloy wheels, fog lights as well as a passenger-side airbag. As with other non-sports limited editions, externally, it was distinguished by its body-coloured mirrors, side protection mouldings and side air dams.

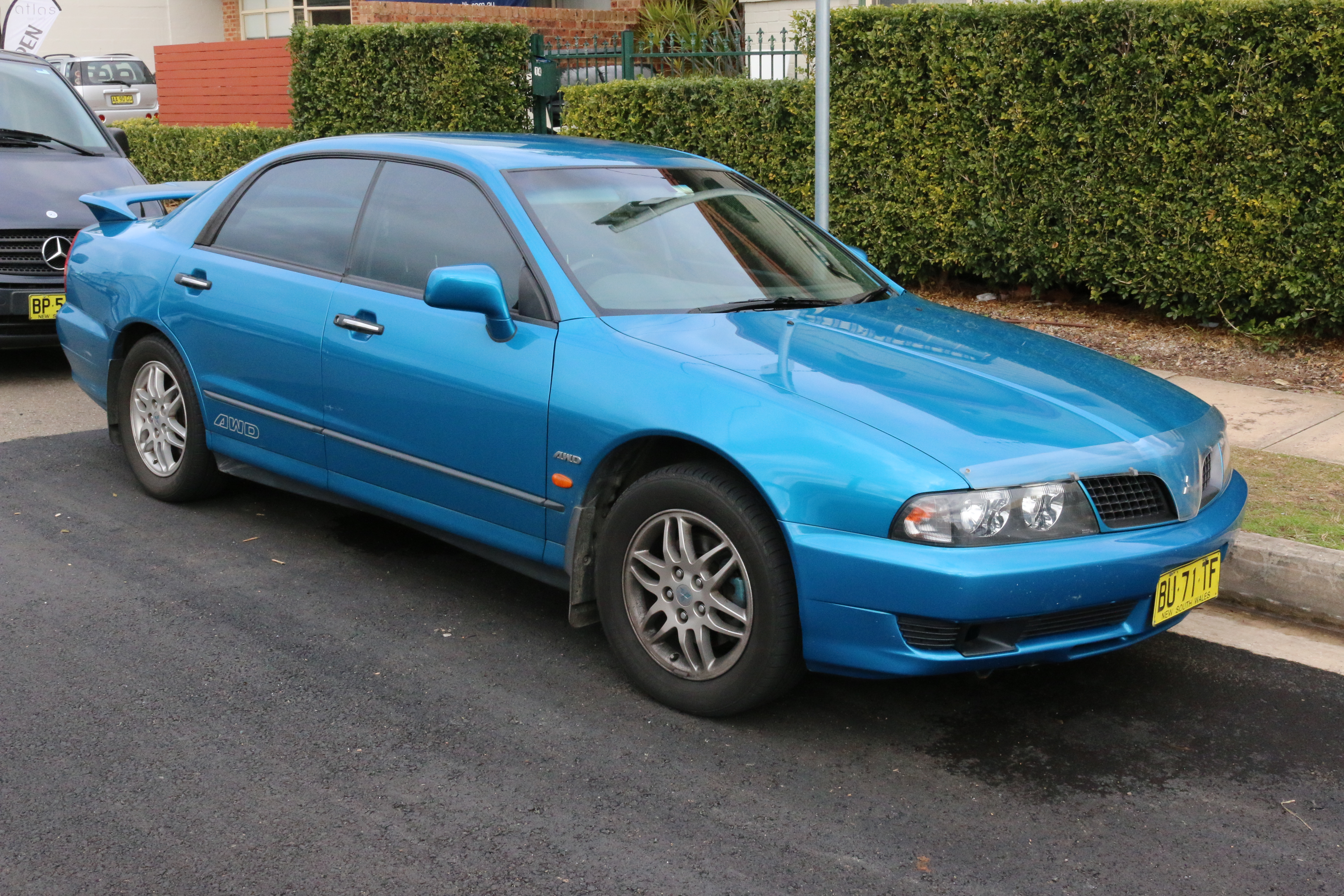
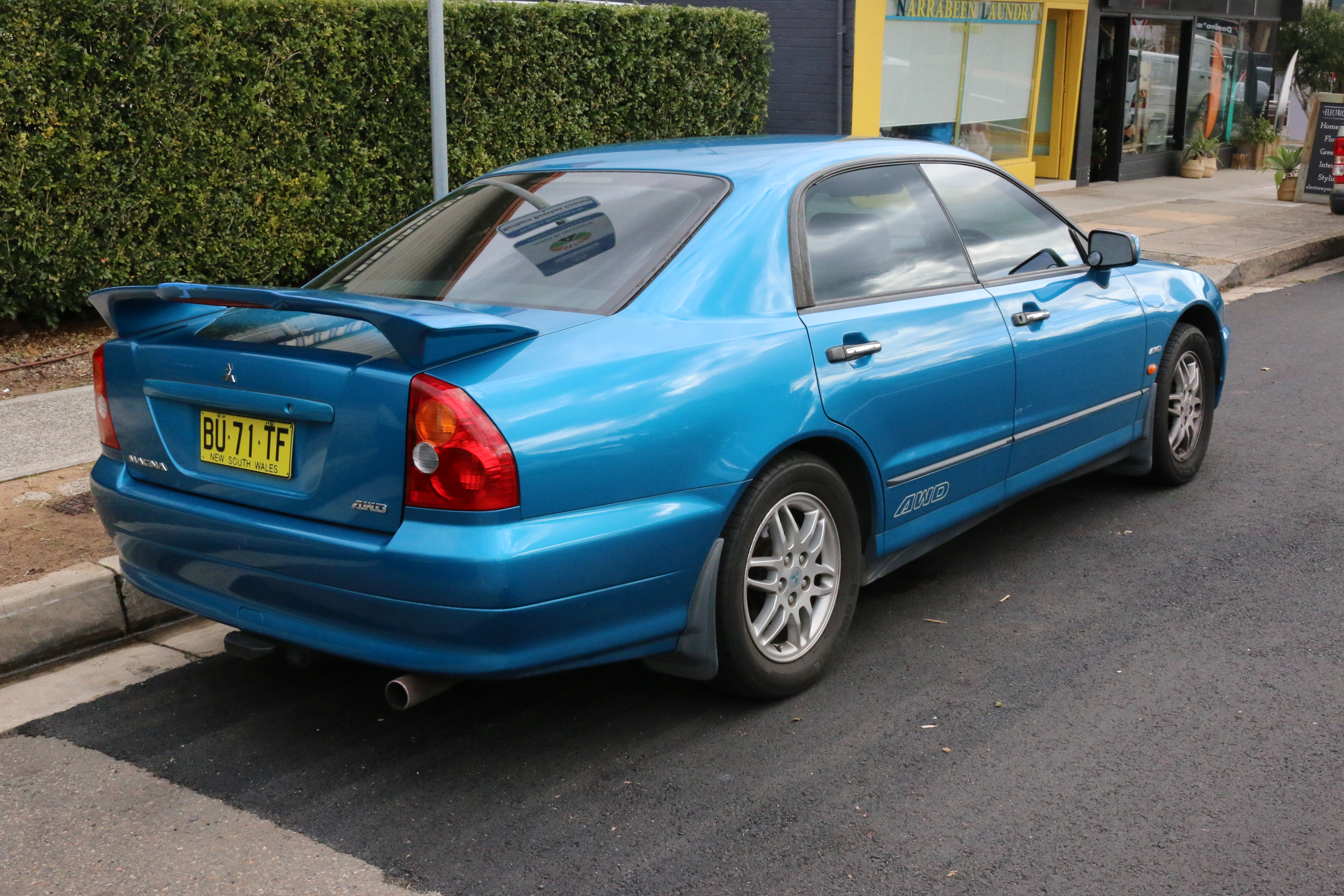
Magna AWD sedan (TJ Series 2)

All-wheel drive

By far the biggest highlight of the TJ Series 2 was the introduction of the sedan-only Magna/Verada AWD range, whose mechanicals remained available to the market until 2005, when the new, FWD-only, Mitsubishi 380 was launched.

Marketed as "Quadtec", the AWD system sought to leverage off Mitsubishi's international rally heritage and carried a development cost of $10 million. With its introduction, MMAL could claim the title of being the first Australian mass-built AWD passenger car (excluding the XY Falcon-based commercial utility produced and sold by Ford Australia in the 1970s). The range comprised only three sedans available only with the five-speed automatic transmissions: Magna AWD, Magna Sport AWD and Verada AWD.

With Magna now competing well in terms of overall size, the AWD development was an attempt by MMAL to counter Australians' long held perception that its perennial RWD rivals – the market-dominant Ford Falcon and Holden Commodore – offered better handling. This led to a A$500,000 advertising campaign including on television, which portrayed a high speed sprint involving a Magna AWD, Holden Commodore (VY) and Ford Falcon (BA), with the latter RWD cars oversteering wildly out of control on a dirt bend. The television advertisement became the subject of complaints alleging that it promoted unsafe driving. This resulted in MMAL being forced to make changes following the intervention of the Advertising Standards Board finding the company to be in breach of a then new national code for car advertising.

Overall, the Magna and Verada AWD failed to provide any noticeable boost in sales. The drivetrain proved to be mechanically reliable with improved handling compared to the FWD version, albeit at the cost of lower performance and official fuel consumption figures. Specifically, Magna AWD and Verada AWD shared the 154 kW (207 hp)/310 N⋅m (229 lb⋅ft) engine, while the Sports AWD had a 159 kW (213 hp)/318 N⋅m (235 lb⋅ft) version. Those power and torque outputs – and overall performance – were down on equivalent FWD Magna's due to structural revisions (chiefly, a revised firewall developed in Australia by ROH) restricting the Sports' free flowing exhaust system, and the extra weight of the AWD hardware – up to 140 kg (309 lb), depending on model and equipment level. Due to budget and development constraints, the subsequent TL series Magna VR-X AWD was limited to 16-inch alloy wheels instead of the FWD's 17-inch wheels.

Original AWD sales projections were for 300 sales per month, but actual sales by August 2003 showed that only 150 AWDs were being sold each month. Fleets and rental agencies are attributed as the biggest buyers of the initial production. The AWD system was available only on sedans and only with the five-speed automatic transmission of the FWD Magna Sports/VR-X and Verada.

Marketing initiatives

Despite its competitive pricing relative to the key rival products from Holden, Ford, and Toyota, ongoing speculation of the Adelaide plant's closure forced MMAL to launch extensive marketing campaigns and promotions, such as free servicing and cash-back offers. Another initiative included the TJ Magna, spearheaded by the Magna VR-X and Magna wagon models, becoming the official vehicles of the 2002 Tour Down Under international cycling event held in Adelaide. Following the Magna Ralliart and Sports wagon a year prior, in October 2002, MMAL also displayed at the Sydney Motor Show a Ralliart painted in the same yellow paint as the Lancer Evolution of the time, to renew interest in its performance range. The colour was marketed as Wasp Yellow and thus made available on the Magna VR-X, Ralliart and Verada GTVi. Prototypes painted in various ChromaFlair paints (bearing the experimental "XX" paint code) were also displayed over time, but never officially marketed.

=== TL / KL ===
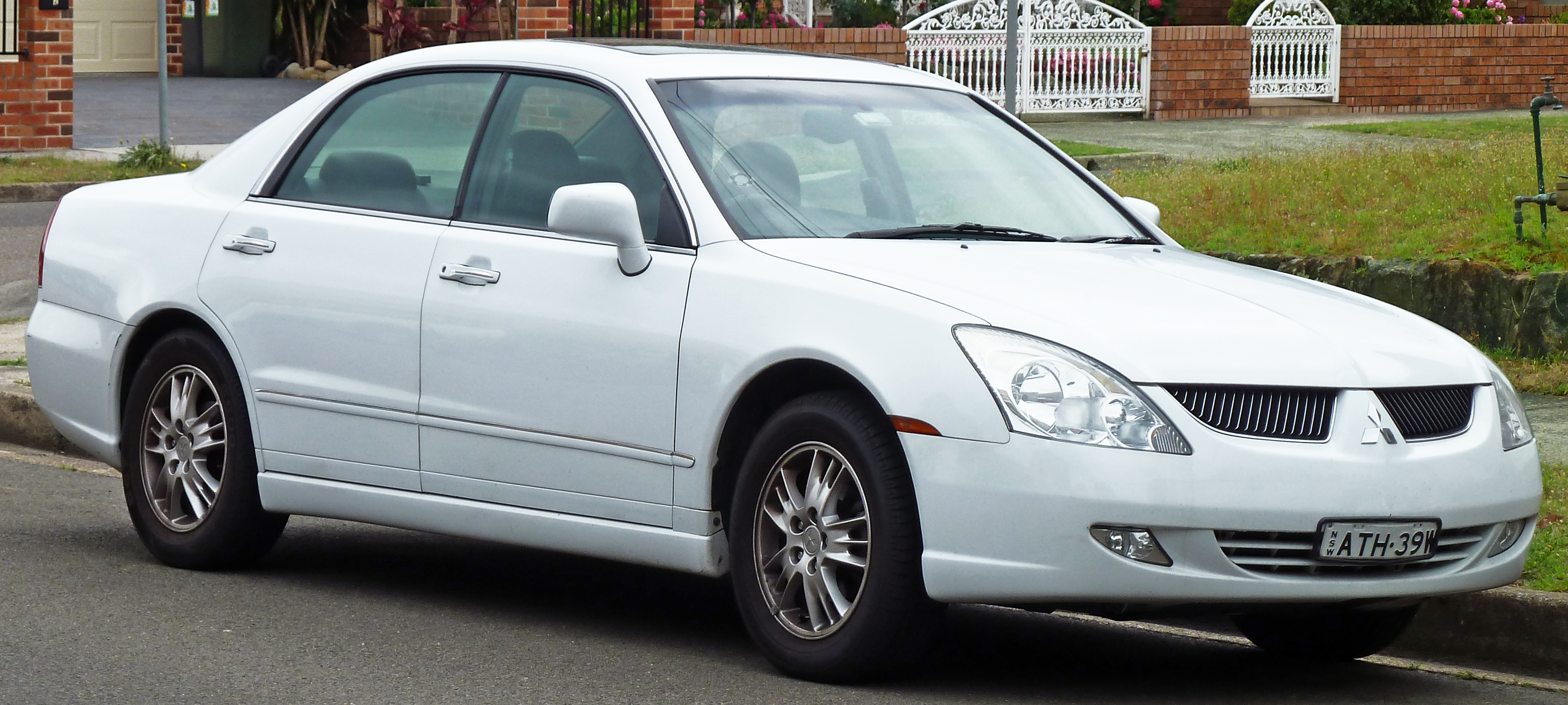
Verada Xi sedan (KL)

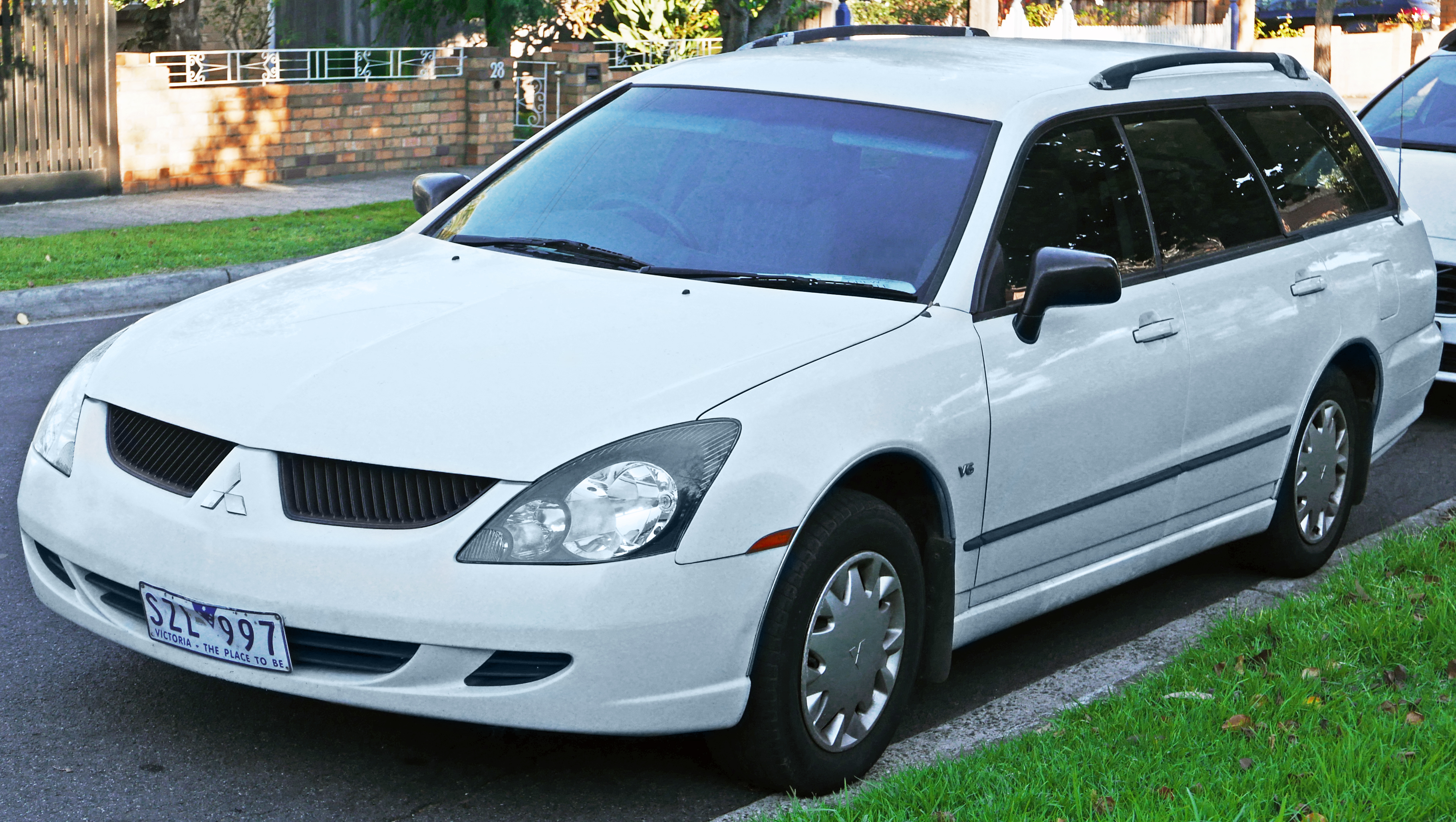

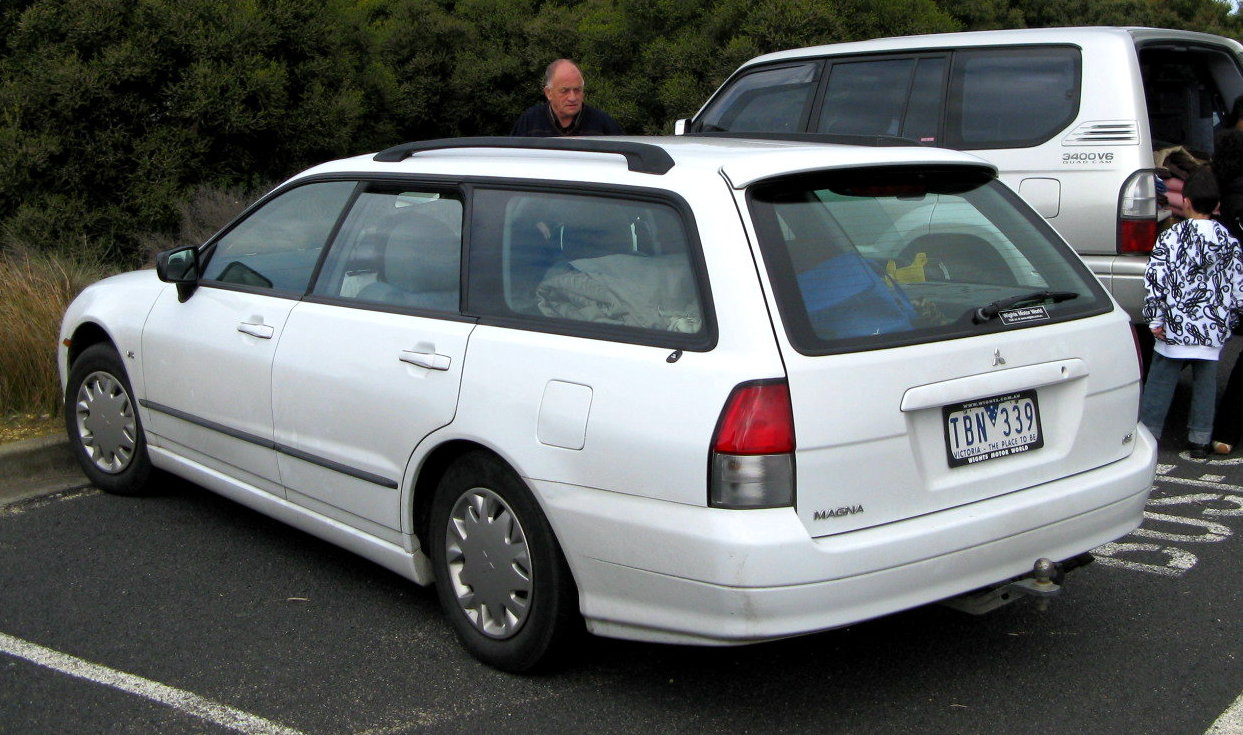
Magna ES wagon (TL)

In April 2003, an Australian-made vehicle was previewed internationally for the first time, thanks to the new KL series Diamante (based on the new Verada) being displayed at that year's New York Motor Show. Australia had to wait for the launch of the TL and KL series (codenamed "XR") until July 2003. The new series featured restyled front and rear ends, and mildly revised mechanicals and interior trims.

The project was said to have cost over A$70 million (including A$2 million alone for the radical new headlights) and the range no longer featured Executive, Altera or Sports models, which had been replaced by ES, LS and VR, respectively. The only carryover badge remained VR-X. A limited edition "Solara" was reoffered, carrying electric windows, alloy wheels and deck lid spoiler. Full leather trim became an option on the VR-X and the export Diamante went on sale in Canada for the first time.

A Ralliart-accessorised VR and VR-X Limited Edition from March 2004 was marketed with the aid of Mitsubishi rally driver, Ed Ordynski. These models featured the TJ series Magna Ralliart's Koni suspension components and Enkei alloy wheels but no upgraded engine or brakes relative to the rest of the range. Other distinctive features included full colour-coding especially of the headlight surrounds, which was later adopted across the whole TW series.

Although mechanically the new TL and KL series remained the same as the preceding TJ, stylistically, it had been radically facelifted by French designer Olivier Boulay. Gone were the somewhat angular lines featured since the first TE series, which were instead replaced by what Mitsubishi's new global head of design envisioned as the new Mitsubishi corporate face (a style that would eventually be grafted onto other Mitsubishi vehicles, beginning with the Lancer Evolution and Colt/Mirage). The frontal appearance of the TL/KL series had a distinctive grille, which was again divided in the middle like on the TJ series, but this time by an extension of the bumper bar and not the bonnet. Larger chrome Mitsubishi triple diamonds logo adorned the front bumper, whereas the front guards now had a swoopy appearance with triangular headlamp assemblies. On its sides, new design, colour-coded plastic door handles, rocker panels and skirts were introduced. At the rear, a rounded boot lid and bumper bar were fitted to continue the swoopy front theme, but the rear tail lights remained effectively unchanged from those of the TJ series (except for VR-X and Verada Xi AWD which featured darkened lenses). The new car's styling was controversial and not well received by Australian buyers; sales slowed dramatically.

Three new colours were added to the TL and KL series: Tanami (metallic gold), Grange and—from September 2003 production—Starlight (a pearl white, which replaced Cocoon White).

Both the facelifted Magna and Verada benefited from a number of safety upgrades, as proven by the fact that all models met the then latest offset deformable barrier (ODB) and dynamic side impact requirements. In addition, front driver and passenger airbags became standard along with side airbags contained in the front seat bolsters. While the wheelbase of the new series had not changed, rear legroom was claimed to have been increased by reshaping the rear cushion of the front seats, the rear seat and by re-arranging the rear seat hip points and squabs. Other interior revisions included rear air vents for the first time on Magna as well as electric driver's seat height adjustment. For the first time, a factory-fitted GPS system was also offered as an option whereas most cars gained a rotary climate control panel, without the previous digital display. Systematic cost-cutting measures included the relocation of the front power window controls on the lesser Magna models from the door panels to the centre console, plus the removal of the individual battery cover compartment in the engine bay.

The drivetrains of the TL/KL series for all models remained the same as that of the respective TJ/KJ Series 2 models, including those of the AWD and dedicated LPG models. The only difference consisted of rear stabiliser bars now fitted to all sedans.

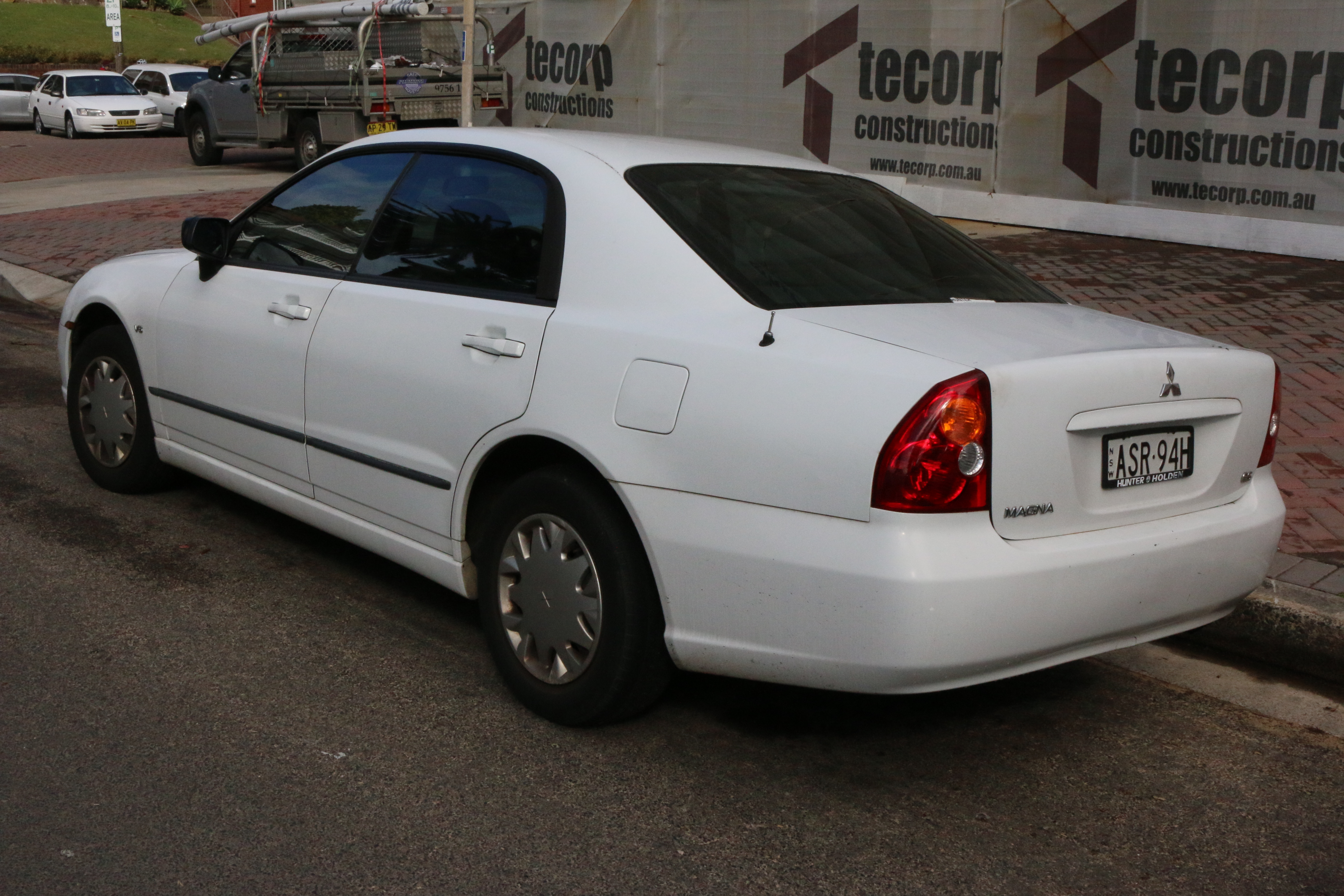
Magna ES (TL)

In terms of the AWD range, by 2003 sales extended to private buyers following the initial uptake by fleets (such as the NSW and New Zealand Police) and rental agencies. In TL guise, Sports models were now renamed as VR and, apart from AWD-specific driving and handling characteristics, MMAL relied on minimal badging to differentiate this range from FWD models. On the competition front, the TL Magna AWD entered in the Australian Cup class of the Australian Rally Championship in 2004, winning on debut—albeit as the only car entered in its class.

In June 2004, VR models were discontinued, leaving the VR-X 2WD as the sporty model in the Magna range. A new VR-X AWD model was also announced at this time, going on sale 1 August (with the update for both models labelled MY04) but only offering 16-inch wheels as opposed to the 17-inch version fitted to the 2WD. VR-Xs were now distinguished by body coloured headlight bezels, a body coloured upper grille, silver mesh lower grille, a platinum coloured rear bumper insert (except for Platinum coloured cars, which received a Sable insert), and an extended chrome exhaust outlet. Mitsubishi also revised badging, with the "AWD" badge no longer on the front fender, and the "Magna" badge removed from the rear decklid. A "VR-X" badge is located on the right-hand side of the decklid, with an "AWD" badge situated on the left-hand side on AWD models. A "QuadTec" badge is located immediately underneath the "AWD" decklid badge, and an "AWD" decal is located on the lower rear doors of the all-wheel drive variants. Inside, a revised black cloth upholstery is standard, with black leather trim now extending to the steering wheel, transmission lever and handbrake. Colours were revised for the MY04 VR-Xs, with the release of Platinum metallic (replacing Pewter), Zen pearlescent (replacing Pacific Blue), and Fusion.

Overall, the TL Magna was hampered by its old architecture and design which was not more heavily redeveloped or replaced altogether due to the ever-increasing financial crisis that hit Mitsubishi's North American operations, plus a notorious recall scandal that tarnished Mitsubishi of Japan at the time (and caused its then partner, Daimler-Chrysler, to eventually sever its commercial links).

=== TW / KW ===
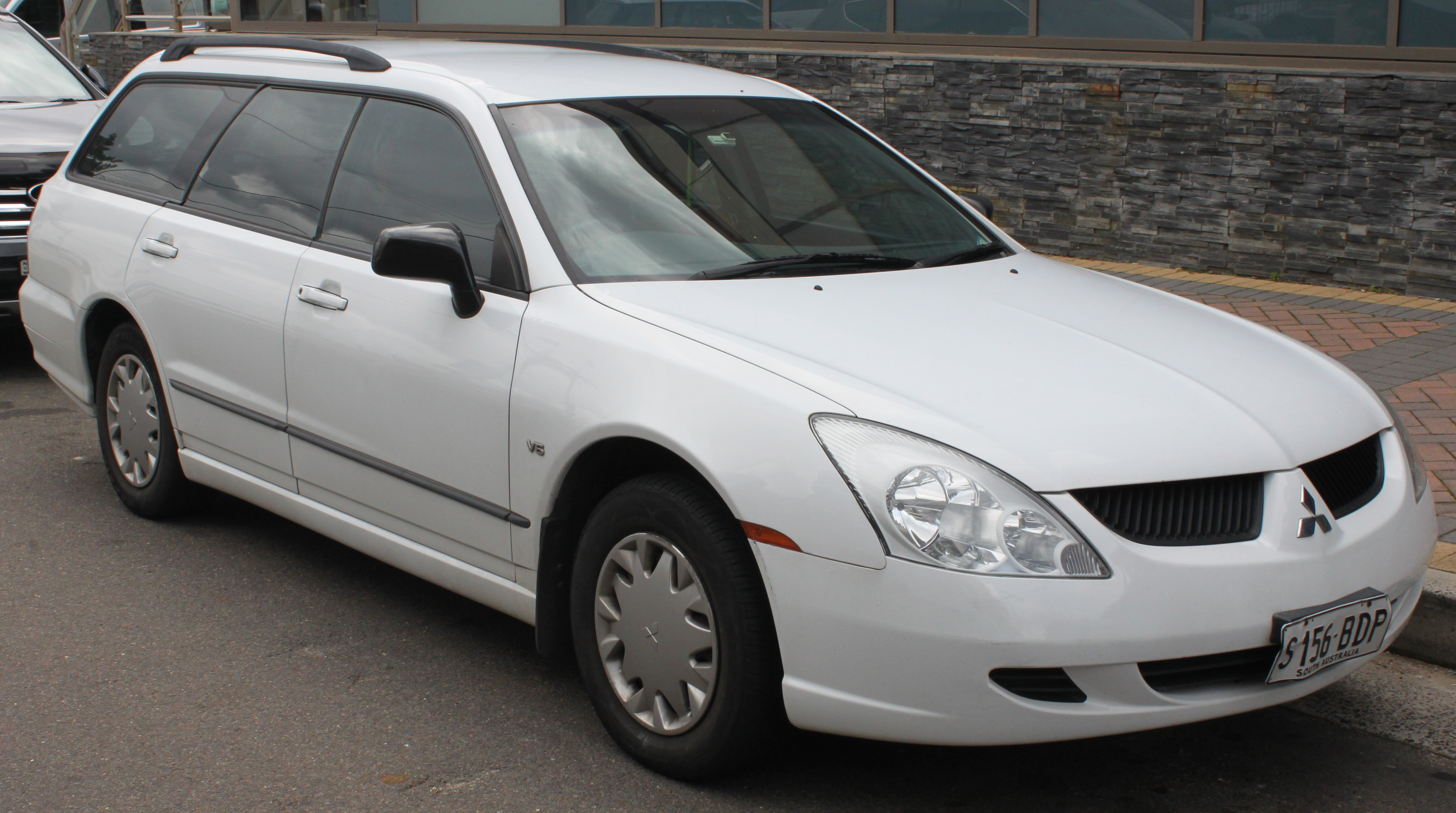
Magna ES wagon (TW)

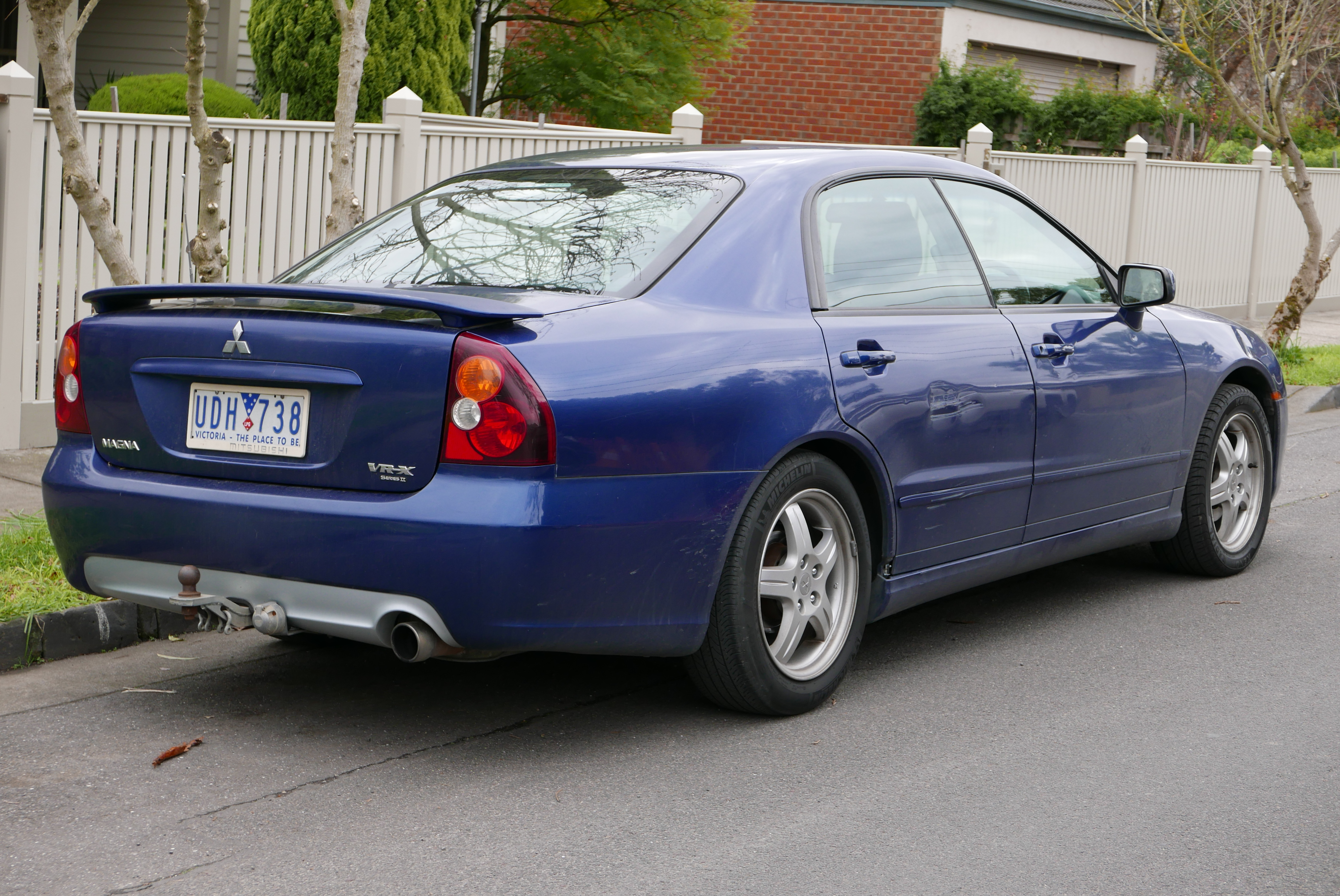
Magna VR-X sedan (TW)

A minor facelift, coded as the TW series Magna and KW Verada, launched in October 2004 and can be differentiated by "Series II" badging and colour-coded headlight bezels for the Magna ES and LS and larger US-spec bumpers for Verada models. Mitsubishi adjusted the model range, with the Magna LS sedan (but not wagon) disappearing from the range, the base Magna AWD becoming the Magna LS AWD sedan, and the addition of the Verada GTVi AWD sedan, a combination of the former KL Verada GTVi and Verada AWD. The Platinum, Zen, and Fusion paint colours added to the KL MY04 VR-X in June were now available on most models.

With slowing sales, MMAL launched an extended warranty campaign applicable to all cars sold from 1 December 2004. The new market leading warranty programme extended full manufacturer's coverage from three to five years or 130,000 kilometres (81,000 mi), whichever came first, and gave a further five years or 30,000 kilometres (19,000 mi) of coverage on the driveline components to the original owner only. In addition, MMAL launched an advertising campaign that starred MMAL's then CEO Tom Phillips stating to potential customers "If you can find a better built car—buy it!". This approach recycled the advertising used by Chrysler in the US in the early 1980s, when Lee Iacocca used a similar slogan. Both strategies helped reduce the number of stockpiled vehicles from 5,500 in September 2004 down to 800 by June 2005—an important requirement in the lead-up to the launch of the Mitsubishi 380 replacement in October.

Given its long-serving architecture and slow sales from circa 2000, MMAL management specifically excluded the Magna as a name for its replacement—the eventual 380. However, TL and TW Magnas became popular in the second hand market given their sound engineering, reliability and low resale values—the latter due in part to heavy discounting when new and also of its 380 successor.

=== Safety ===
ANCAP test results* Mitsubishi Magna ES sedan (2003)
Test	Score
Overall	3 /5 stars
Frontal offset	10.71/16
Side impact	11.49/16
Pole	Not Assessed
Seat belt reminders	0/3
Whiplash protection	Not Assessed
Pedestrian protection	Poor
Electronic stability control	Not Assessed

=== List of models ===
TE (1996–1997)

- Executive (2.4-litre 4-cylinder and 3.0-litre V6)
- Advance (3.0-litre V6)
- Altera (2.4-litre 4-cylinder and 3.0-litre V6)
- Altera LS (3.0-litre V6; 4-speed automatic)

Luxury series:

- Verada Ei (3.5-litre V6; 4-speed automatic)
- Verada Xi sedan (3.5-litre V6; 4-speed automatic)

Note: manuals always five-speed only and all non-limited edition models offered in sedan and wagon with manual or automatic transmissions unless specifically noted (TE to TW series).

TF (1997–1998)

- Executive (2.4-litre 4-cylinder and 3.0-litre V6)
- Advance (3.0-litre V6)
- Altera (3.0-litre V6; 4-speed automatic)
- Altera LS (3.0-litre V6; 4-speed automatic)
- Sports sedan (3.0-litre V6; manual or 4-speed Tiptronic automatic)

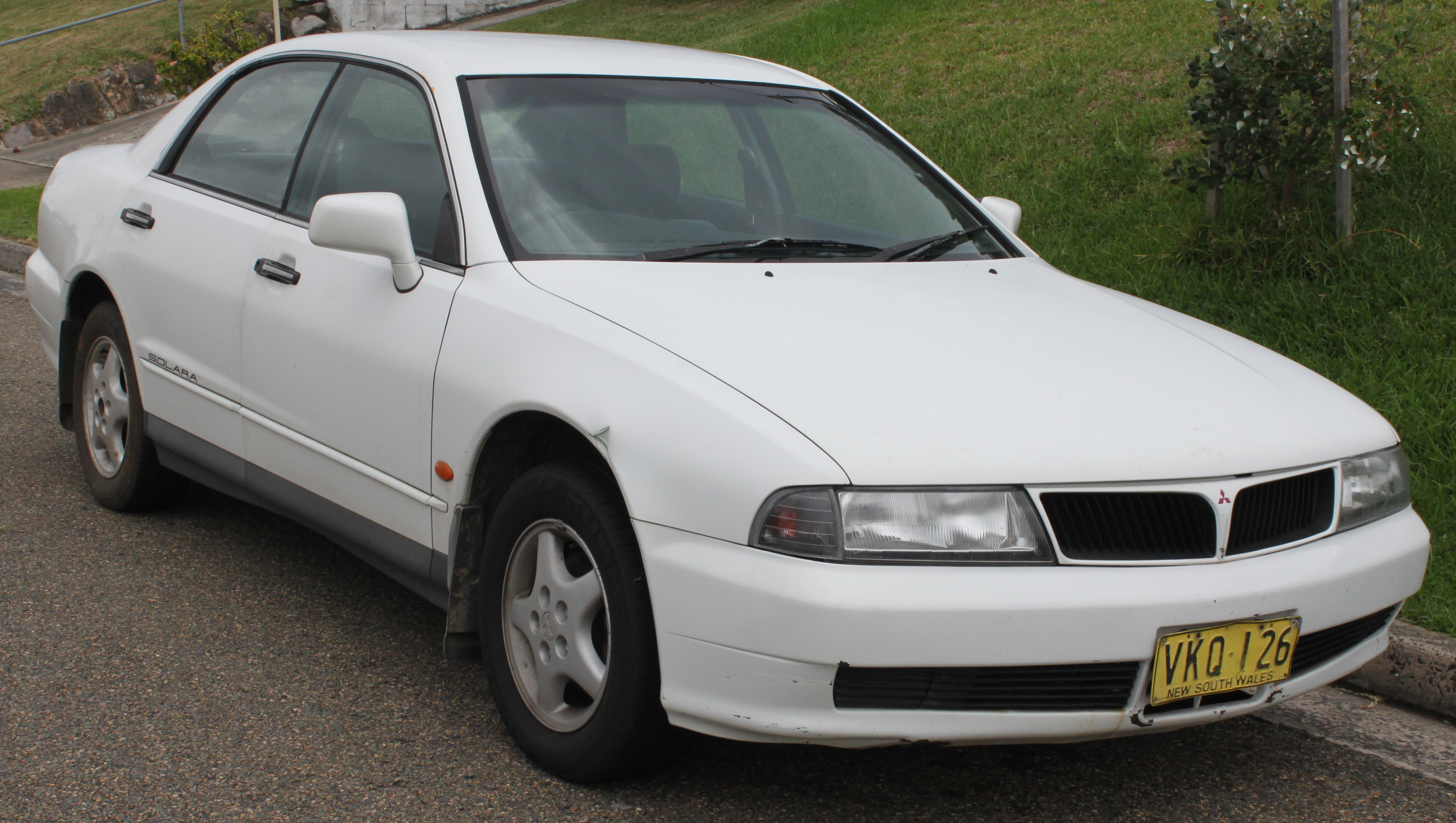
Magna Solara sedan (TF)

Limited editions:

- Solara (July and August 1998: based on Executive 3.0-litre V6)

Luxury series:

- Verada Ei (3.5-litre V6; 4-speed automatic)
- Verada Xi sedan (3.5-litre V6; 4-speed automatic)

Note: TF is the last Magna series offered with a four-cylinder engine (never fitted to Verada).

TH (1999–2000; the first approx. 30 units built in December 1998)

- Executive (3.0-litre or 3.5-litre V6)
- Executive LS (May–June 2000: 3.5-litre V6; 4-speed automatic)
- Advance (3.5-litre V6)
- Altera LS (1999: 3.5-litre V6; 4-speed automatic)
- Sports sedan (3.5-litre V6; manual or 4-speed Tiptronic automatic)

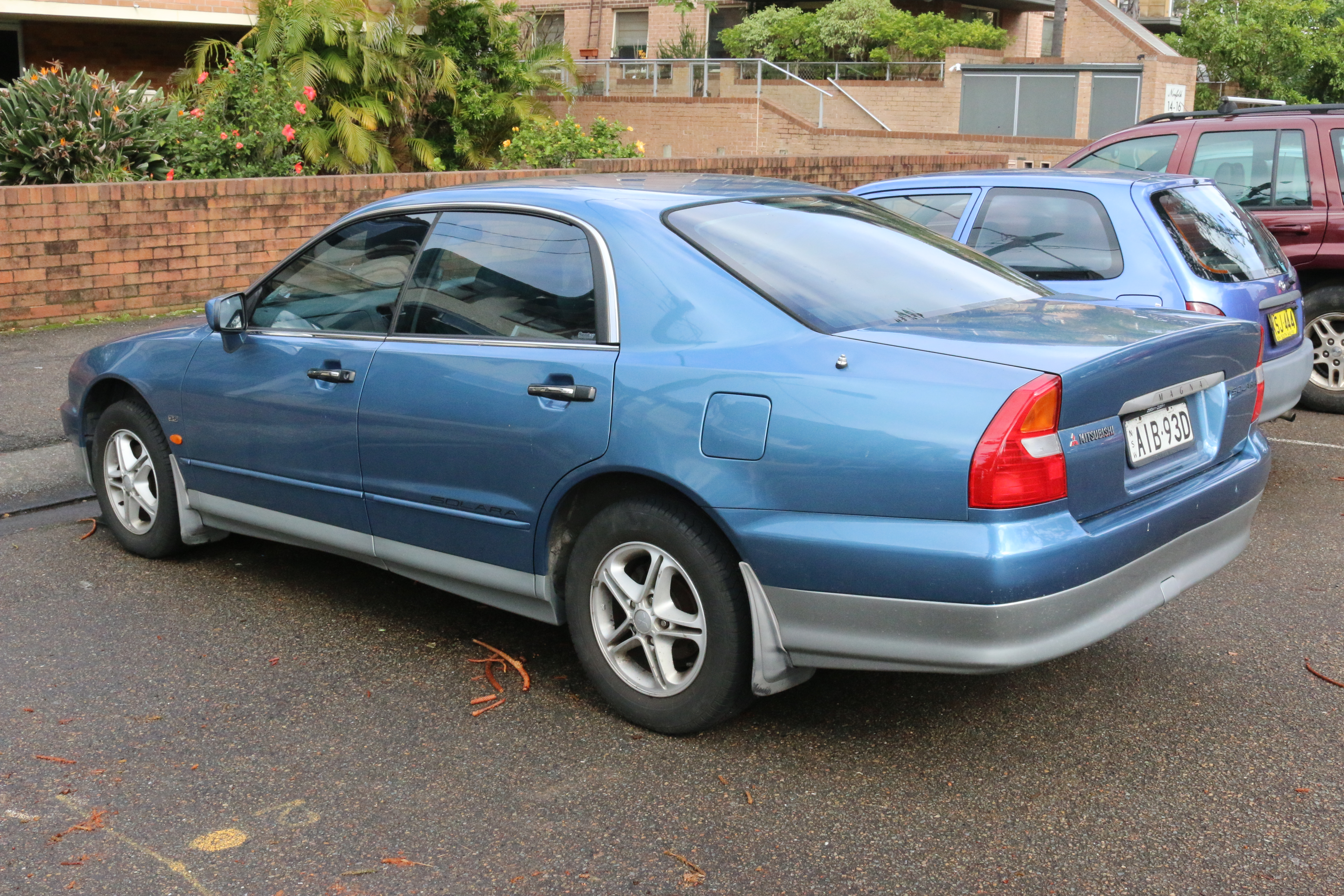
Magna Solara sedan (TH), now distinguished by two-tone paint

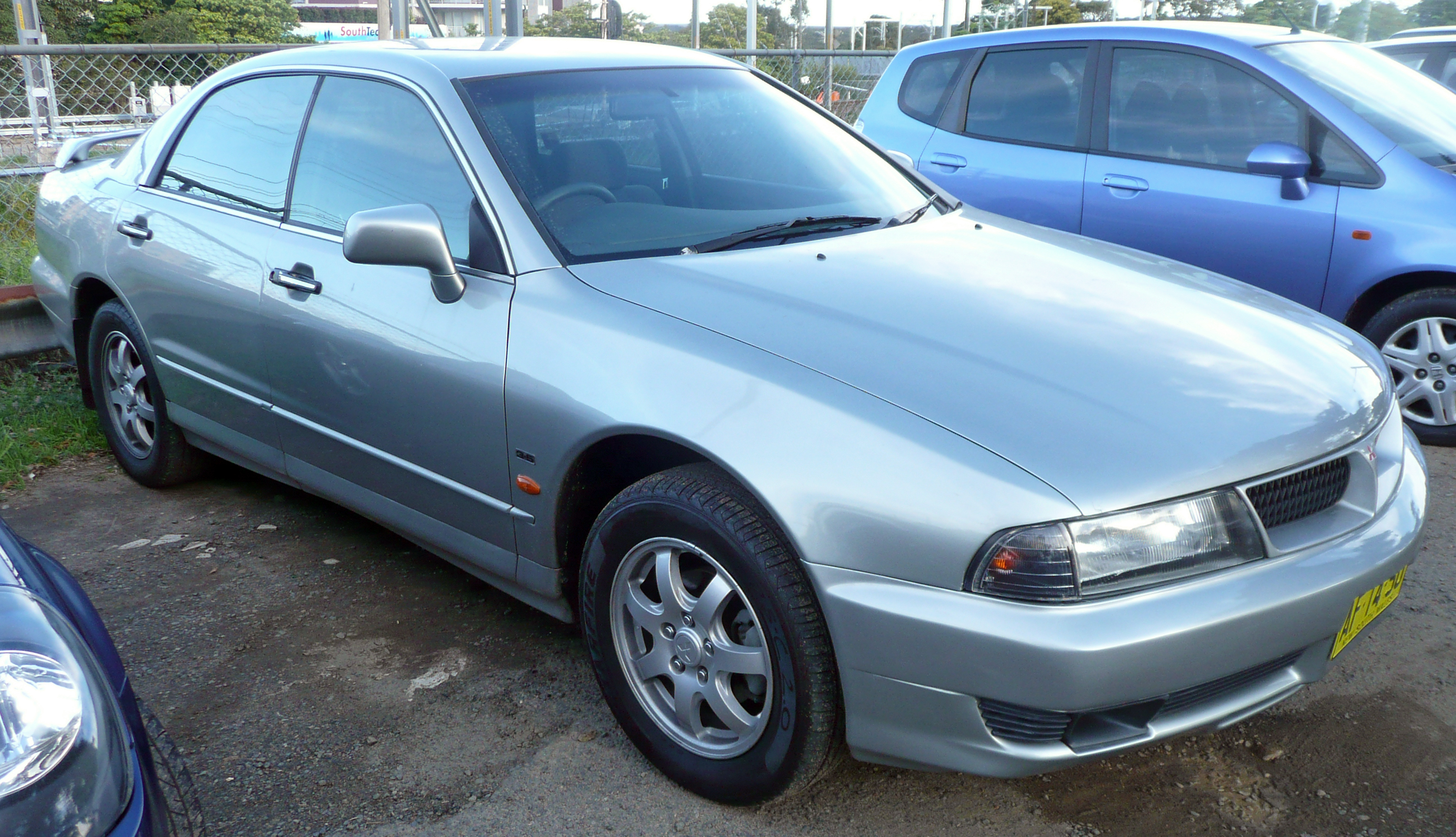
Magna V6 Si sedan (TH)

Limited editions:

- Solara (based on Advance, same interior trim as Advance)
- V6 Si (based on Executive 3.5-litre V6)

Luxury series:

- Verada Ei (3.5-litre V6; 4-speed automatic)
- Verada Xi sedan (3.5-litre V6; 4-speed automatic)

TJ (2000–2003)

- Executive (prior to TJ Series 2: 140 kW 3.0-litre V6 or optional 150 kW 3.5-litre V6; latter only engine after TJ Series 2 with 150 kW output)
- Executive LPG (from April 2003: 143 kW 3.5-litre V6; 4-speed automatic only; first dedicated LPG Magna)
- Advance (150 kW and later 155 kW 3.5-litre V6)
- Advance LPG (from April 2003: 143 kW 3.5-litre V6; 4-speed automatic only; first dedicated LPG Magna)
- AWD sedan (from TJ Series 2: down-powered 154 kW 3.5-litre V6; 5-speed automatic)
- Sports sedan (163 kW 3.5-litre "high output" V6; manual or 5-speed automatic)
- Sports wagon (late 2001: 163 kW 3.5-litre "high output" V6; 5-speed automatic)
- Sports AWD sedan (from TJ Series 2: down-powered 159 kW Sports 3.5-litre V6; 5-speed automatic)
- VR-X sedan (based on Sports but with full bodykit; 163 kW 3.5-litre "high output" V6; manual or 5-speed automatic)
- Ralliart sedan (2002: based on VR-X but with revised bodykit; uprated 180 kW 3.5-litre V6; manual with LSD; 5-speed automatic from Sports/VR-X; total production approx. 500 individually numbered; 4 units painted in Wasp Yellow in 2003)

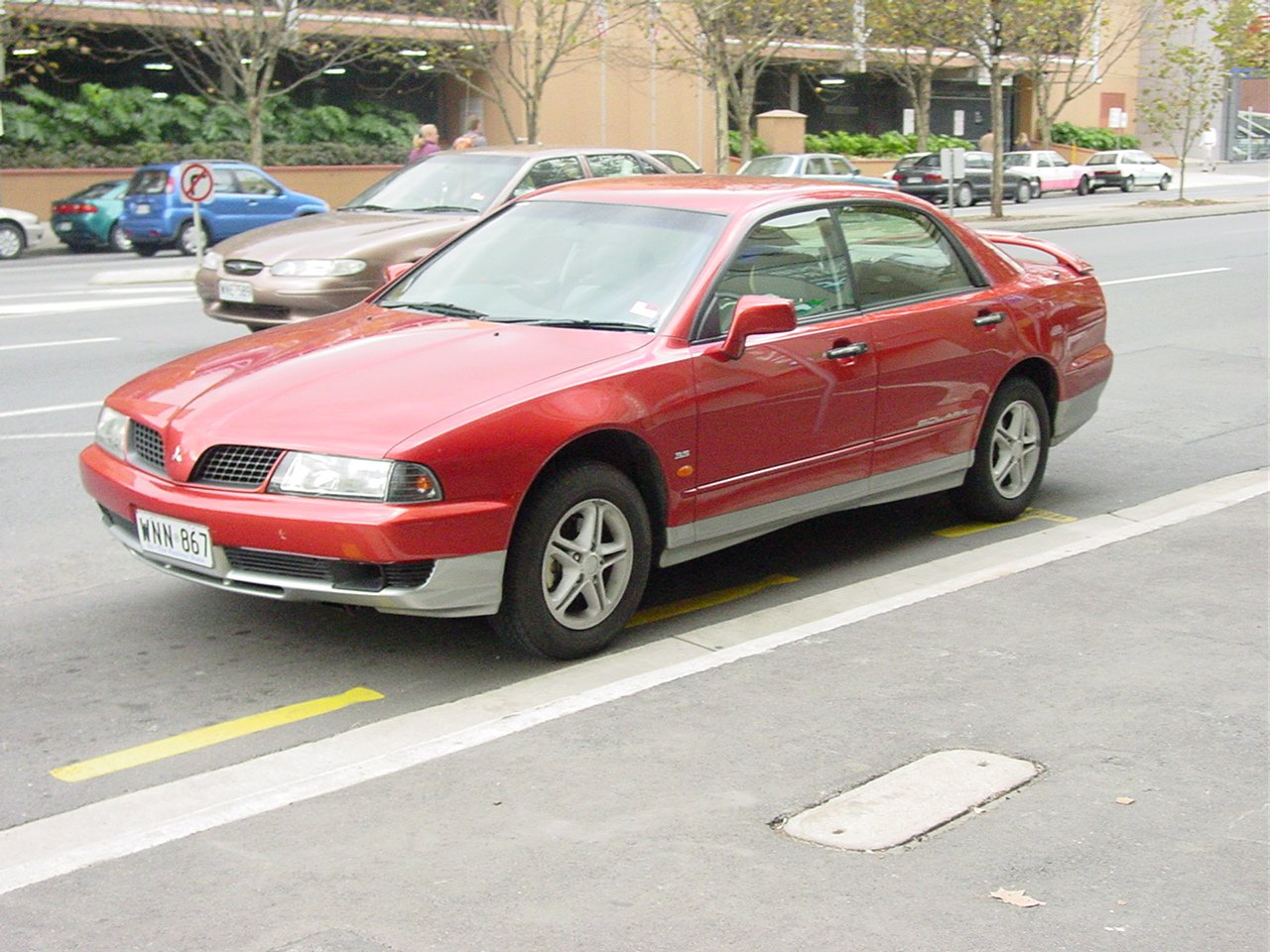
Magna Solara sedan (TJ)

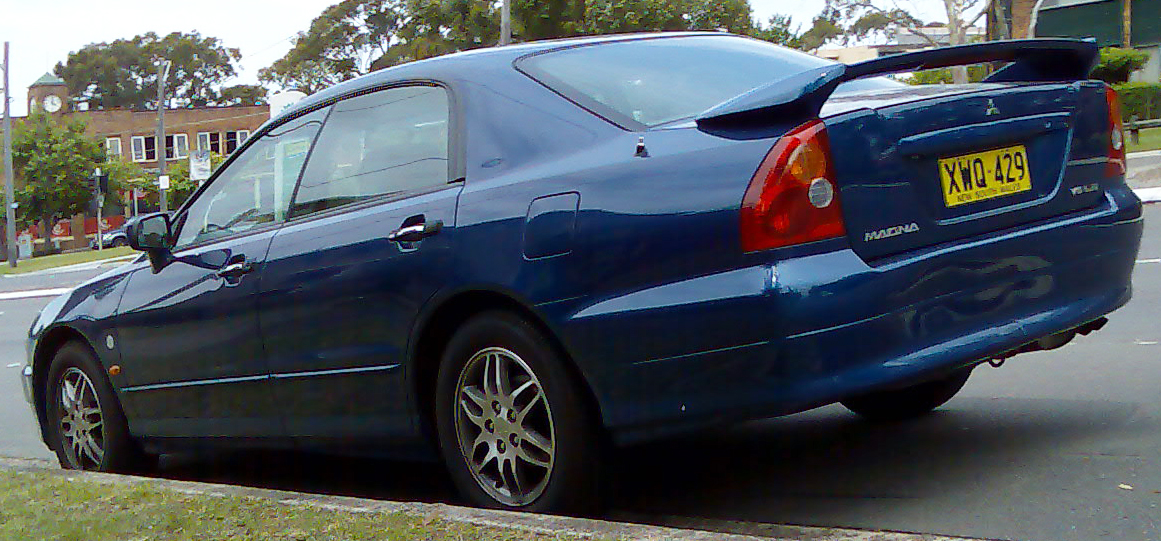
Magna Commonwealth Games Edition sedan (TJ MY02)

Limited editions:

- Solara (based on Advance; 4-speed automatic; 2 versions)
- V6 Si (based on Executive; in Sports/VR-X colours only)
- Commonwealth Games (based on Executive; in Sports/VR-X colours only)
- Limited Edition (badged "LE" and based on Executive with Verada appointments; 4-speed automatic; KJ series front parabola headlights with amber turn bezels)
- VR-X Limited Edition sedan (May 2001: 175 units built; August 2001: 95 units built (MY02); featuring leather pack with matching instrument dials, black/silver wrapped steering wheel, silver centre dash, 2-DIN Verada sound system, 17-inch wheels with revised suspension settings and optional sunroof)
- VR-X sedan painted in Wasp Yellow (2002–2003: total 50 cars built)

Luxury series:

- Verada Ei (150 kW and later 155 kW 3.5-litre V6; 4-speed automatic and later 5-speed)
- Verada Xi sedan (150 kW and later 155 kW 3.5-litre V6; 4-speed automatic and later 5-speed)
- Verada AWD sedan (from TJ Series 2: down-powered 154 kW 3.5-litre V6; 5-speed automatic)
- Verada GTVi sedan (from March 2003: 163 kW 3.5-litre "high output" V6 from Sports/VR-X; 5-speed automatic; 20 units painted in "Wasp Yellow")

Limited editions:

- Verada GTV sedan (from July 2002: 163 kW 3.5-litre "high output" V6 from Sports/VR-X; 5-speed automatic; limited to 400 units prior to becoming permanent model, GTVi)

Note: May 2001 and September 2001 updates bear no revised badging, unlike "Series 2"; transition from 150 kW to 155 kW for 3.5-litre V6 engine from September 2001 update; manual transmission not available in wagons, dedicated LPG or AWD models; all 5-speed automatic transmissions Tiptronic, as on 4-speed automatics from TJ MY02 series, with former transmission only on all AWD range and on Verada from KJ Series 2 upgrade; AWD range fitted only with 16-inch wheels; VR-X sedan only (TJ to TW series).

TL (2003–2004)

- ES (previous 3.5-litre V6; manual or 4-speed automatic; replaced Executive)
- ES LPG sedan (previous dedicated 3.5-litre V6; 4-speed automatic)
- LS (previous 3.5-litre V6; manual or 4-speed automatic; replaced Advance)
- LS LPG sedan (previous dedicated LPG 3.5-litre V6; 4-speed automatic)
- AWD sedan (previous down-powered 3.5-litre V6; 5-speed automatic)
- VR (previous uprated 163 kW 3.5-litre V6; manual and 5-speed automatic; replaced Sports)
- VR AWD sedan (previous down-powered Sports 3.5-litre V6; 5-speed automatic)
- VR-X sedan (previous uprated 163 kW 3.5-litre V6; manual and 5-speed automatic)

Limited editions

- Solara (based on ES; automatic)
- VR Limited Edition sedan (2004: main highlights – Koni suspension and Enkei wheels from TJ Magna Ralliart; standard VR/VR-X engine)
- VR-X Limited Edition sedan (2004: main highlights – Koni suspension and Enkei wheels from TJ Magna Ralliart; standard VR/VR-X engine)

Luxury series:

- Verada Ei (previous 3.5-litre V6; 5-speed automatic)
- Verada Xi sedan (previous 3.5L-litre V6; 5-speed automatic)
- Verada GTVi sedan (previous 3.5-litre V6 from Sports/VR-X; 5-speed automatic; permanent range model)
- Verada AWD sedan (previous down-powered 3.5-litre V6; 5-speed automatic)

TW (2004–2005)

- ES (previous 3.5-litre V6; manual and 4-speed transmission)
- ES LPG sedan (previous dedicated 3.5-litre V6; 4-speed automatic)
- LS AWD sedan (previous down-powered 3.5-litre V6; 5-speed automatic)
- LS wagon (previous 3.5-litre V6; 4-speed automatic; LS FWD sedan discontinued)
- VR wagon (previous uprated 163 kW 3.5-litre V6; 5-speed automatic; rare model; VR sedan discontinued)
- VR-X sedan (previous uprated 163 kW 3.5-litre V6; manual or 5-speed automatic)
- VR-X AWD sedan (previous down-powered Sports/VR 3.5-litre V6; 5-speed automatic; new model replacing VR AWD sedan)

Luxury series:

- Verada Ei (previous 3.5-litre V6; 5-speed automatic)
- Verada Xi sedan (previous 3.5-litre V6 5-speed automatic)
- Verada GTVi sedan (previous 3.5-litre V6 from Sports/VR-X; 5-speed automatic)
- Verada AWD sedan (previous down-powered 3.5-litre V6; 5-speed automatic)

== Sales ==
Australian sales
Variant						1985	1986	1987	1988	1989
Magna I4						26,902	30,540			
Variant	1990	1991	1992	1993	1994	1995	1996	1997	1998	1999
Magna I4	31,808	27,066	29,020	27,114	24,828	16,619	10,209	5,916	3,099	307
Magna V6				5,903	12,208	13,850	20,640	29,964	29,523	24,814
Verada		1,699	4,989	4,654	3,437	2,746	1,538	5,128	3,222	3,118
Variant	2000	2001	2002	2003	2004	2005	2006	2007		
Magna V6	23,270	21,720	21,258	21,541	14,250	11,415	591	3		
Verada	3,001	2,661	2,147	2,125	1,718	1,054	51	3		

=== Exports ===
Throughout the Magna and Verada's time on sale, Mitsubishi Australia exported the model to a variety different countries. The Northern American market saw the luxurious Verada range imported as the Diamante. It was also sold in the United Kingdom, where they imported the Magna Wagon and Diamante Sedan (from Japan) to be collectively sold under the Sigma Nameplate.

Mitsubishi also imported the Verada Wagon, (as the Diamante), into Japan to complement their own Diamante Sedan.

New Zealand saw both nameplates imported, with the added induction of the Mitsubishi V3000.

In smaller markets, the Magna was exported to the Middle East.

The following table lists the Export Markets.

Market	Year																				
Market	85	86	87	88	89	90	91	92	93	94	95	96	97	98	99	00	01	02	03	04	05
New Zealand			°	°	°	°	°	°	°	°	°	°	°	°	°	°	°	°	°	°	°
USA							°	°	°	°	°	°	°	°	°	°	°	°	°	°	
Canada																			°	°	
Japan														°	°	°	°	°	°	°	°
UK						°	°	°	°	°	°	°	°	°	°	°	°	°	°	°	
Puerto Rico																°	°				
Middle East			°	°	°	°	°	°	°	°	°	°	°	°	°	°	°	°	°	°	
