= Proton Perdana (second generation) =

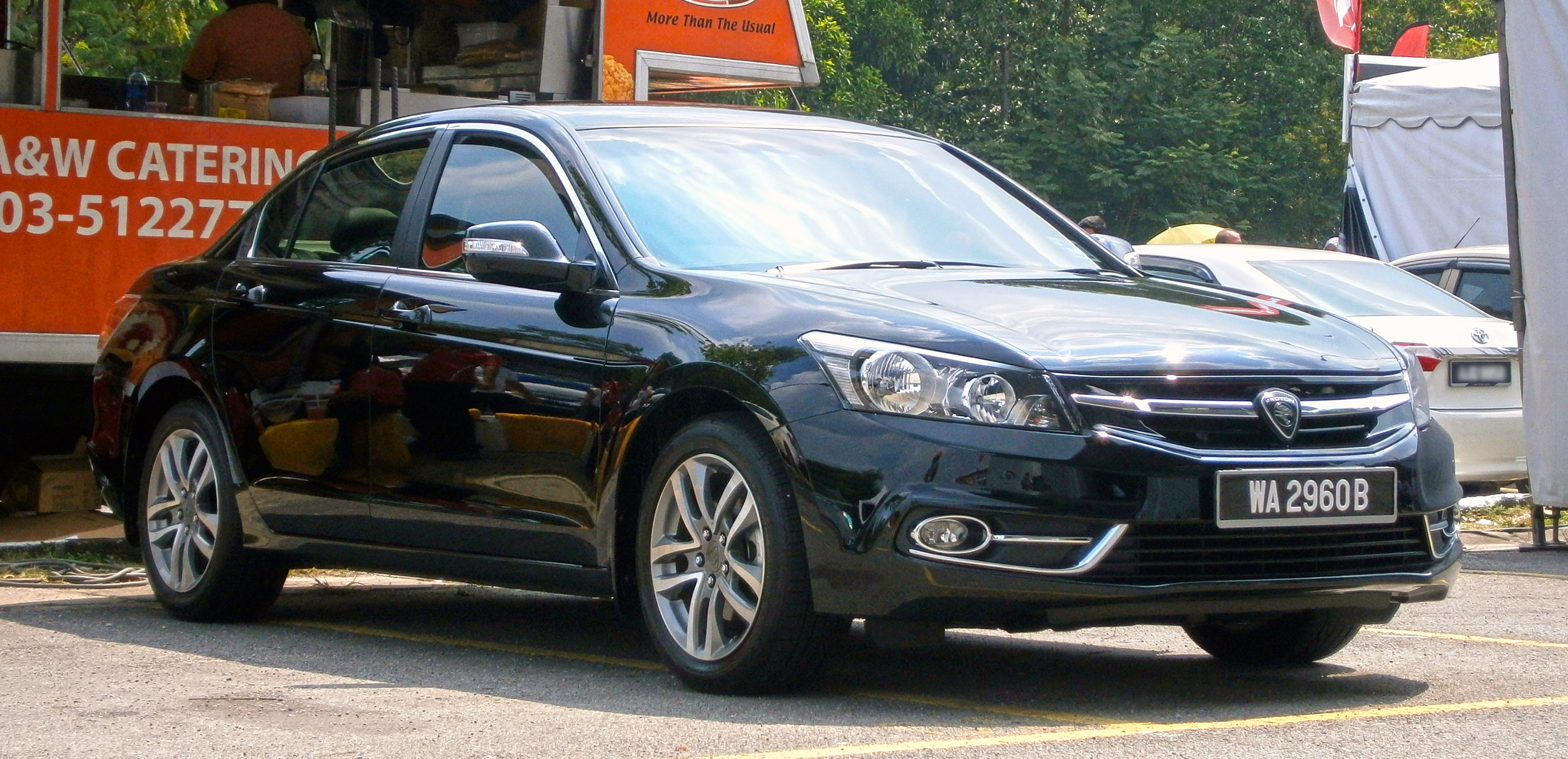
- 2014 Proton Perdana 2.4P

Overview
- Manufacturer: Honda Motor Company, Ltd. Proton
- Also called: Honda Accord (eighth generation)
- Production: December 2013 – April 2020; 7,420 Units sold
- Assembly: Malaysia: Malacca (HMSB 2013–2016); Shah Alam, Selangor (PROTON Sdn. Bhd. 2016–2020)
- Designer: Bostami Ahmad; Daisuke Sawai (Accord)

Body and chassis
- Class: Mid-size car (D)
- Body style: 4-door sedan
- Layout: Front-engine, front-wheel drive

Powertrain
- Engine: Petrol: 2.0 L R20A3 I4; 2.4 L K24Z2 I4
- Transmission: 5-speed automatic

Dimensions
- Wheelbase: 2,800 mm (110 in)
- Length: 4,998 mm (196.8 in)
- Width: 1,845 mm (73 in)
- Height: 1,475 mm (58 in)
- Kerb weight: 1,535 kg (3,384 lb)

Chronology
- Predecessor: Proton Perdana (first generation)

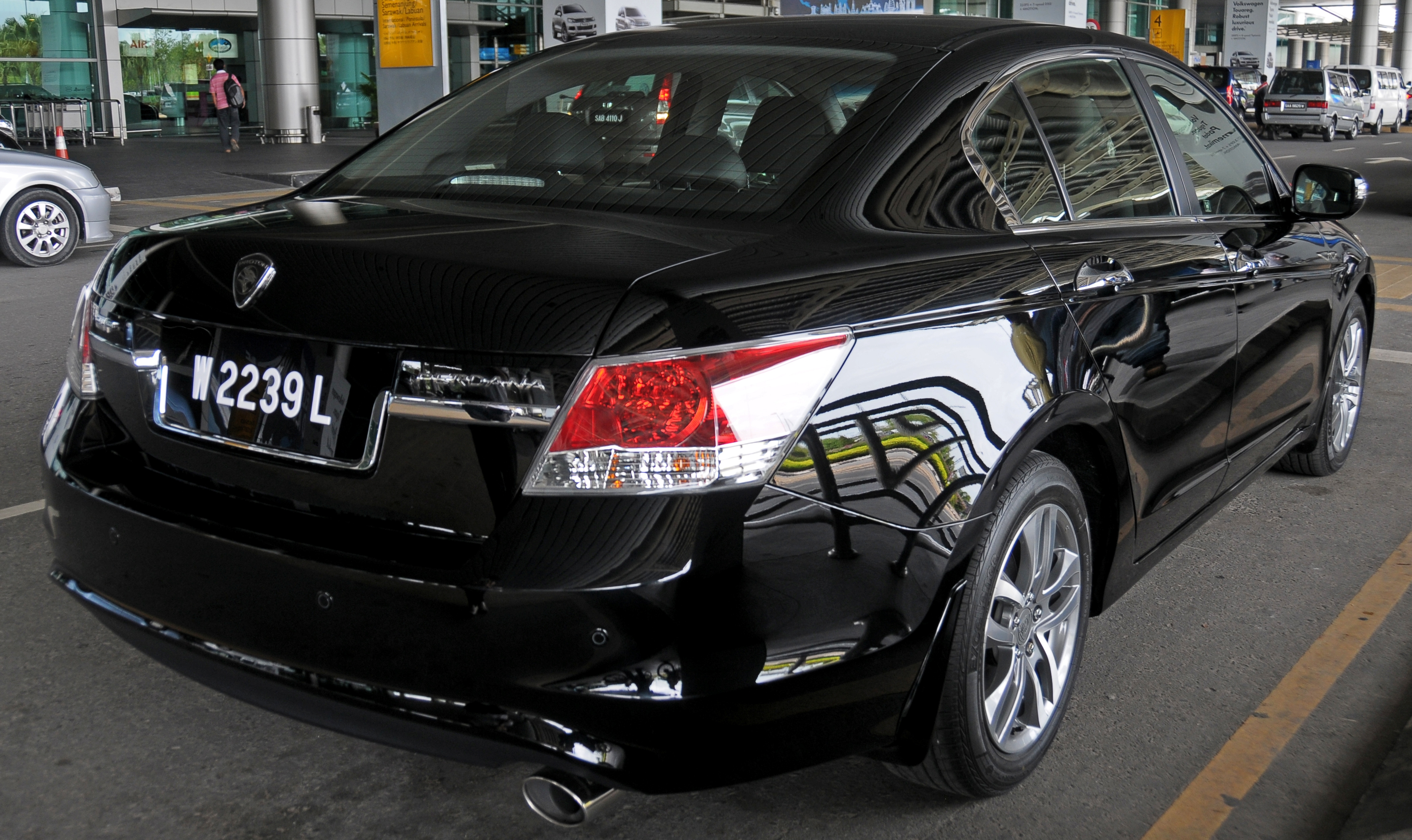
2014 Proton Perdana 2.4P in Kota Kinabalu, Malaysia.

The second generation Proton Perdana is a mid-sized four-door saloon from Malaysian automobile manufacturer Proton. It was unveiled on 11 December 2013 as the successor to the original Proton Perdana, and is a badge engineered version of the eighth generation Honda Accord.

Perdana is the Malay language word for Prime.

== Overview ==
Proton refers to the 2013–2015 models as the second generation Proton Perdana and the 2016–2020 models as the facelifted second generation Proton Perdana. However, the general public commonly refers both 2013–2015 models and 2016–2020 models based on the eighth generation Honda Accord as second generation Proton Perdana's.

The second generation Proton Perdana project included two phases of development, in which the P4-90B represents the latter half. The second generation Perdana was launched in two phases: the first in mid-December 2013, for sale exclusively to the Malaysian government and the second in June 2016, for the Malaysian Domestic Market. The first phase, second generation Perdana is simply a rebadged North America eighth generation Honda Accord, with minimal exterior and interior changes.

== History ==
=== Pre-launch ===
The Proton Perdana was first introduced in 1995 to serve the niche Malaysian luxury market segment which consisted of vehicles with engine displacement of 2,000cc and above. Proton considered a replacement for the Perdana in 2004 under a tie-up with Volkswagen and again in 2005 with Mitsubishi Motors Australia for its 380. However, both ventures were unfruitful and the Perdana continued in production up until 2010. Proton signed a Memorandum of Understanding with Nissan in 2011 with the intention of rebadging the Nissan Fuga or Infiniti M for exclusive sale to Malaysian government officials, but no further developments occurred and the venture was abandoned.

On 29 October 2012, Proton entered a collaboration with Honda. Both companies have agreed to explore collaboration opportunities in the areas of technology enhancement, new product line up and the sharing of vehicle platforms and facilities. In April 2013, it was revealed that the Proton Perdana Replacement Model (PRM) would most likely be based on a Honda Accord chassis, and be powered by Proton's newly acquired range of Petronas E01e 1.8, 2.0 and 2.2 litre engines. Furthermore, it will not be limited to government officials, and will also serve as an instrument to Honda's expansion into the Malaysian market. Additionally, the name Proton Suprima was filed for trademark status under the Intellectual Property Corporation of Malaysia (MyIPO) in January 2013, where the name Suprima has its roots in the English word Supreme, widely speculated and deemed fitting for the Proton PRM's official product name. However, on 14 August 2013, a spyshot of a Proton P3-22A test drive unit confirmed the name Proton Suprima S as the final and official product name of the hatchback complement of the Proton Prevé instead.

On 7 November 2013, spyshots revealed that the PRM would indeed be based on the North American eighth generation Honda Accord. It is not known whether the PRM would be exported to other countries, although such plans are highly unlikely judging from the Proton Inspira's marketing strategy. Unlike the Inspira, which was sold alongside the Mitsubishi Lancer which it was based on, the PRM will present no marketing conflicts to its sister car, as Honda Malaysia has already launched the new ninth generation Honda Accord on 4 September 2013.

The development of the earlier first phase, second generation Perdana spanned from late-2012 to late-2013, or from the announcement of the collaboration between Proton and Honda Motor Company, Ltd to the eight-month product development phase and lastly, the début.

The second generation Perdana commenced production in late-2013 at the Honda Malaysia Sdn. Bhd. plant in Alor Gajah, Malacca.

=== Post-launch ===
On 11 December 2013, the long anticipated second generation Proton Perdana was unveiled at an official ceremony in Putrajaya. It was officially badged simply as the Proton Perdana, but it has also been dubbed the New-look Proton Perdana by local media. The second generation Perdana has thus become the second Proton car after the Saga to use an existing nameplate. A total of 3,000 Perdanas are delivered on a staggered basis over two years to replace the old Perdanas in government service.

Two versions of the Perdana were unveiled, namely 2.0 and 2.4 litre models. Additionally, three bespoke long-wheelbase editions have been produced for the sixth Prime Minister of Malaysia, Najib Razak, Muhyiddin Yassin and the Prime Minister of Turkey, Recep Tayyip Erdoğan, the latter of which is a left-hand drive unit and a celebratory gift in view of the 50th anniversary of Malaysia–Turkey relations. Only two long-wheelbase editions have been produced for exclusive use by the sixth Prime Minister of Malaysia, Najib Razak, Muhyiddin Yassin. Second generation Proton Perdanas are powered by either Honda's 2.0L R20A3 I4 and 2.4L K24Z2 I4 engines.

On 2 March 2014 at 00:01 MST, a convoy of second generation Proton Perdanas fitted with national and state flags were driven across the Penang Second Bridge during its opening ceremony, cueing the national anthem.

On 18 April 2014, during a two-day bilateral visit to Turkey, Malaysian sixth Prime Minister Najib Razak presented a new Proton Perdana limousine to Turkish Prime Minister Recep Tayyip Erdoğan as a celebratory gift marking the 50th anniversary of Malaysia–Turkey relations. Uniquely, this specific Perdana is a left-hand drive (LHD) example, and is thus far the only known all-new Proton Perdana to be exported out of Malaysia. Additionally, Turkey has historically been a strong market for Proton, and the company plans to introduce the new Prevé and Suprima S models in the country by 2014.

Around 3,000 units of the first phase, second generation Perdana was produced to replace the ageing first generation Perdana fleet in use by civil servants and government officials.

At around mid-2015, at least one prototype of the P4-90B had been completed. Mahathir Mohamad, the chairman of Proton, has made mention that an unnamed aircraft company with the capacity to design cars has also been enlisted in the P4-90B's development. Additionally, it is speculated that Mahathir has in his possession a P4-90B prototype, which he has been evaluating personally.

It was reported that Mahathir had exported his personal Perdana to the UK to contribute to R&D efforts to create an electric vehicle. Instead, it was reported to be found in an unused building in Surrey, UK.

=== 2016 facelift ===
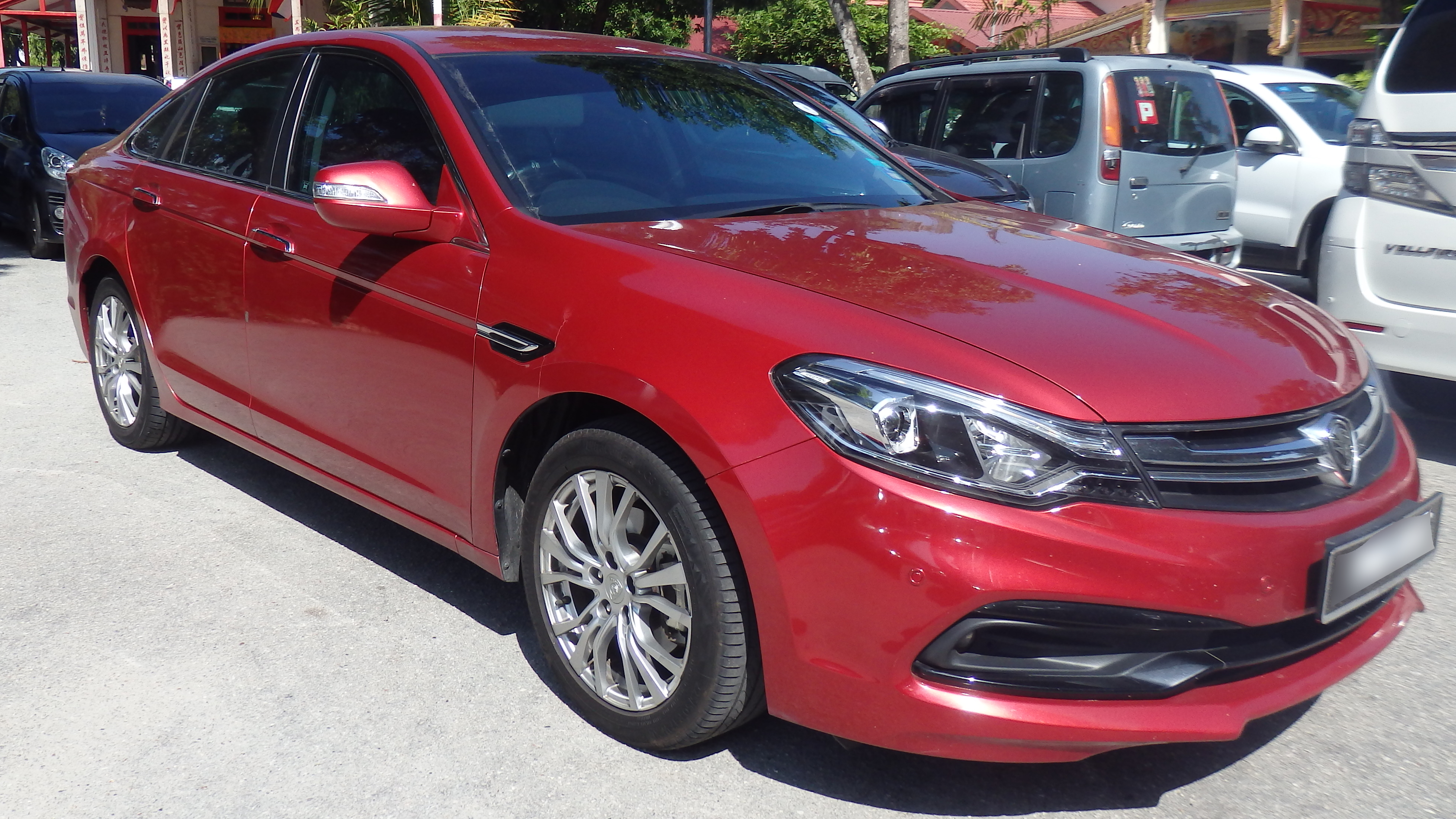
Front view

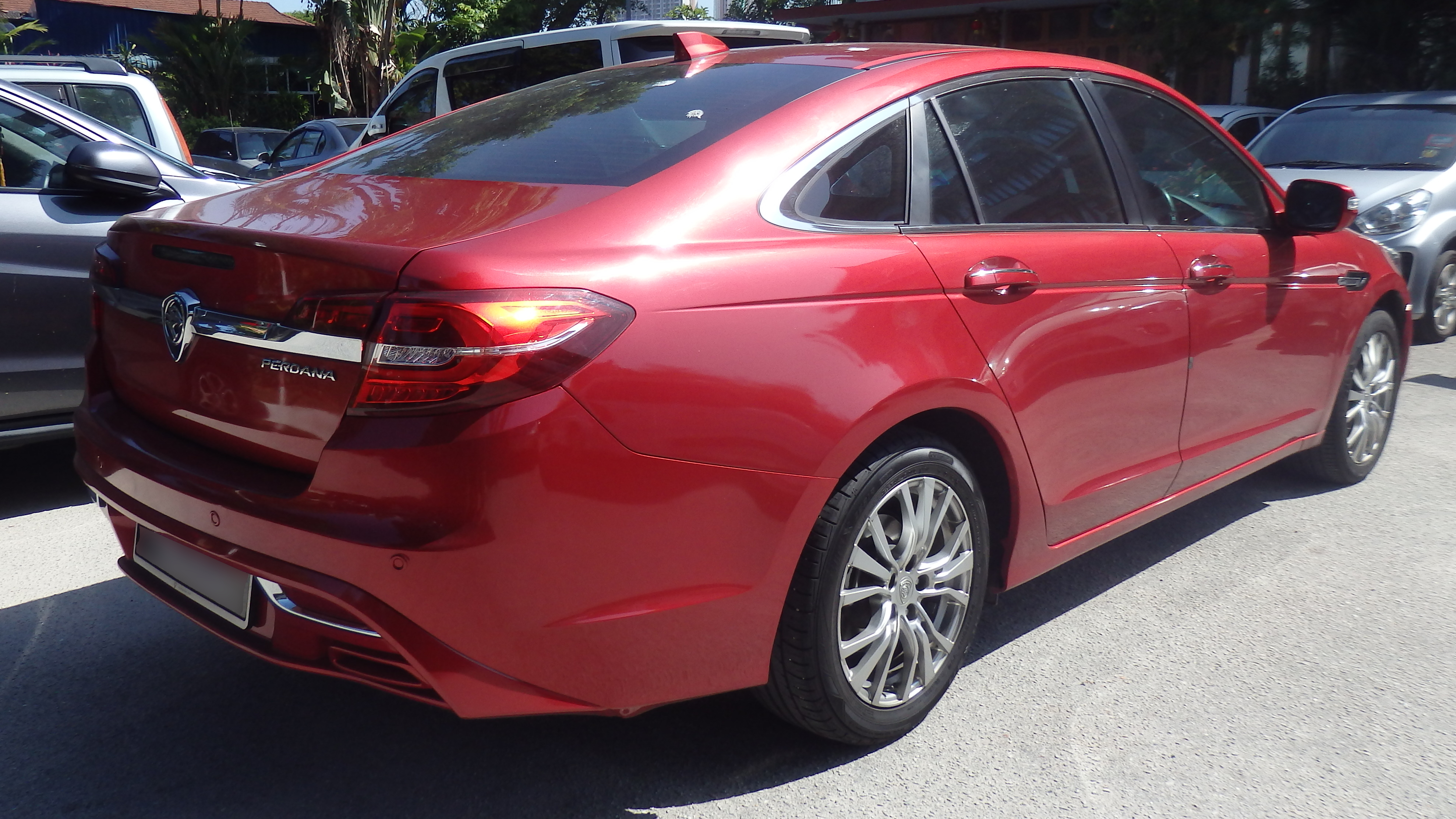
Rear view

A heavily major makeover of the Perdana's exterior based on the eighth generation Accord was launched in Malaysian market on 14 June 2016. The pricing for the facelifted Proton Perdana was revealed on its launching day to be RM113,888 for the 2.0 litre model, and RM138,888 for the 2.4 litre model (both are "on-the-road prices" for West Malaysia).

Standard safety features includes dual front SRS airbags, dual side airbags, ABS with EBD, front active head rest and seatbelts with pre-tensioner and load limiter system. The 2.4 litre model added adds ESC. Exterior colour of the vehicle options will includes Midnight Black, Sterling Silver, Cotton White, Graphite Grey, Ruby Red, Citrine Gold and Silver Moon Dust.

On July 15, 2016, it was suggested by the Argentine ambassador to Malaysia that Proton may have a good market audience if the Perdana is exported to Argentina.

In January 2020, then Finance Minister Lim Guan Eng said that the Perdana is retained as the official vehicle for government ministers.

In April 2020, it was reported that the Proton ended production of the Perdana and was discontinued.

After Anwar Ibrahim became prime minister, he used the limousine version of the Perdana as one of his official vehicles.

== Recall ==
In August 2020, Proton urged drivers of the Perdana made from 2012 to August 2018 to head to the nearest Proton service centre to get the installed Takata passenger airbag inflators changed without charge. Around 6,432 Perdanas are part of the recall.

As of June 2021, around 568 Perdanas did not have their Takata airbags changed.

== Sales ==
Year	Malaysia (Note: Figures based on registration)
2013	13
2014	1,280
2015	1,667
2016	1,383
2017	938
2018	1,237
2019	821
2020	45
2021	36
