= Honda Accord (North America eighth generation) =

Honda Accord Eighth generation (CP1-CP3; CS1-CS2) North America and Asia Pacific
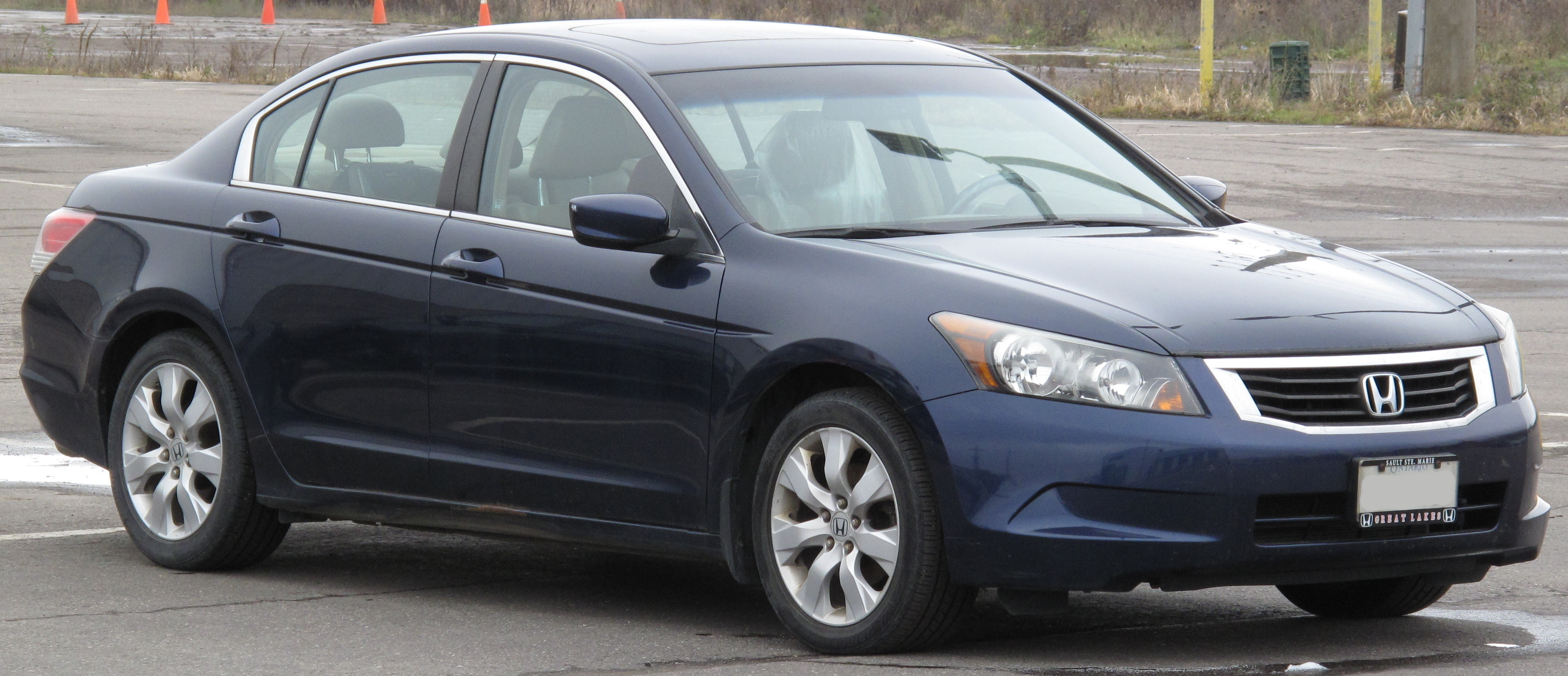

Overview
- Manufacturer: Honda
- Also called: Honda Inspire (Japan); Proton Perdana (Malaysia, 2013–2020)
- Production: August 2007 – 2012
- Model years: 2008–2012
- Assembly: United States: Marysville, Ohio (MAP); Lincoln, Alabama (Honda Manufacturing of Alabama); Japan: Sayama, Saitama; China: Guangzhou (Guangqi Honda); Taiwan: Pingtung; Thailand: Ayutthaya; Malaysia: Alor Gajah, Melaka; India: Greater Noida
- Designer: Daisuke Sawai

Body and chassis
- Class: Mid-size car (D)
- Body style: 4-door sedan 2-door coupe (North America only)
- Layout: Front-engine, front-wheel-drive
- Related: Acura TL; Honda Crosstour

Powertrain
- Engine: Gasoline: 2.0 L R20A3 I4; 2.4 L K24Z2 I4; 2.4 L K24Z3 I4; 3.5 L J35Z3 V6; 3.5 L J35Z2 VCM V6; Diesel: 2.2 L N22A2 turbo I4
- Transmission: 5-speed manual or automatic 6-speed manual

Dimensions
- Wheelbase: Sedan: 110.236 in (2,800 mm); Coupe: 107.9 in (2,741 mm)
- Length: Sedan: 194.9 in (4,950 mm); 2008–2010 Coupe: 190.9 in (4,849 mm); 2011- Coupe: 191.0 in (4,851 mm)
- Width: Sedan: 72.7 in (1,847 mm); Coupe: 72.8 in (1,849 mm)
- Height: Sedan: 58.1 in (1,476 mm); Coupe: 56.4 in (1,433 mm)

Chronology
- Predecessor: Honda Accord (North America seventh generation)
- Successor: Honda Accord (ninth generation)

The North American eighth generation Honda Accord is a mid-size car introduced in August 2007 for the 2008 model year. It is also marketed in parts of Asia and Australasia, and as the Honda Inspire in Japan.

The size of the 2008 Accord has been increased by 4 inches (102 mm) in length and 3 inches (76 mm) in width. As a result, the interior space is also enlarged: an Accord sedan is considered a nearly executive car by EPA standards, having a combined interior space of 120 cubic feet (3.4 m^{3}). The Accord coupe is classified as a mid-size car, as it has a combined interior space of 105 cubic feet (3.0 m^{3}).

== 2007 Accord Coupe Concept ==
The Honda Accord Coupe concept car was unveiled at the 2007 North American International Auto Show. It previewed the production 2-door model with i-VTEC VCM V6 engine and Advanced Compatibility Engineering body structure.

A hybrid version would no longer be offered, as Honda felt their "hybrid system works better on smaller cars".

The production sedan and coupe were unveiled on August 21, 2007. Sales of US models began on September 12, 2007, for the sedan, and on September 20, 2007, for the coupe.

=== HF-S concept ===
At the 2007 SEMA Show, Honda unveiled a concept Accord coupe showcasing Honda Factory Performance products.

== North America production and marketing ==
The North American Honda Accord is sold alongside its platform-mates that are under the Acura luxury marque, the smaller Japanese/European Accord which is badge engineered as the second-generation Acura TSX, and the fourth-generation Acura TL.

A crossover fastback variant of the North American Honda Accord was sold as the Accord Crosstour for the 2010-11 model years, and then spun off into its own separate line as the Crosstour for the 2012-15 model years.

=== Trim levels ===
In Canada, for the 2008-10 model years, the sedan trims consist of the LX, EX, EX-L, EX-L with Navigation, EX-V6, EX-L V6, and EX-L V6 with Navigation, while coupes have the EX, EX-L, EX-L with Navigation, and EX-L V6 with Navigation. The LX is powered by a 2.4L DOHC i-VTEC inline-4 engine making 177 hp mated to either a five-speed manual transmission or five-speed automatic transmission, and is equipped with anti-lock brakes with brake assist and electronic brake force distribution, electronic stability control, front and rear disc brakes, air conditioning, keyless entry, power windows, power locks, and cruise control as standard features, while also having body-colored door handles and mirrors. The EX includes a more powerful version of the inline-4 engine with 190 hp, power moonroof, 17-inch alloy wheels, 8-way power adjustable driver's seat, security system, and a 6-disc CD changer. EX-L denotes Accords with leather upholstery, XM satellite radio, and an optional navigation system and hands-free Bluetooth interface. V6 models have a 3.5 liter 268 hp i-VTEC V6 engine with VCM mated to a five-speed automatic transmission, chrome handles, dual exhaust pipes, and fog lamps. V6 coupes have 18-inch alloy rims and a rear lip spoiler. V6 coupes with the optional six-speed close ratio manual transmission used the non-VCM VTEC variant of the J35 engine.

The United States include all the trims found in Canada, while also offering the LX-P (Premium) sedan, which adds illuminated power window switches, an 8-way power driver's seat, security alarm, and 16-inch alloy wheels, and the LX-S (Sport) coupe, which replaces the 177 hp engine with a 190 hp, 17-inch alloy wheels, and a 6-disc CD changer.

In the United States, PZEV (Partial Zero Emissions Vehicle) configurations are available for all 4-cylinder engines and V6 i-VTEC VCM engines with 5-speed automatic transmission. PZEV engines include 2 modes of exhaust valve operation. At Below 2,500 rpm, only 1 exhaust valve operates, creating a strong rotational flow in the exhaust gases that creates a "thermal reactor" effect to reduce hydrocarbon emissions. Above 2,500 rpm where exhaust flow increases, a hydraulically actuated pin locks the rockers for both exhaust valves together so they operate in unison, following a single cam profile. Due to a smaller profit margin on a PZEV for the manufacturer, Honda only offered them in 15 states: California, Florida, Vermont, Connecticut, Arizona, Maryland, Massachusetts, Pennsylvania, New York, Oregon, Maine, New Jersey, Rhode Island, New Mexico and Washington.

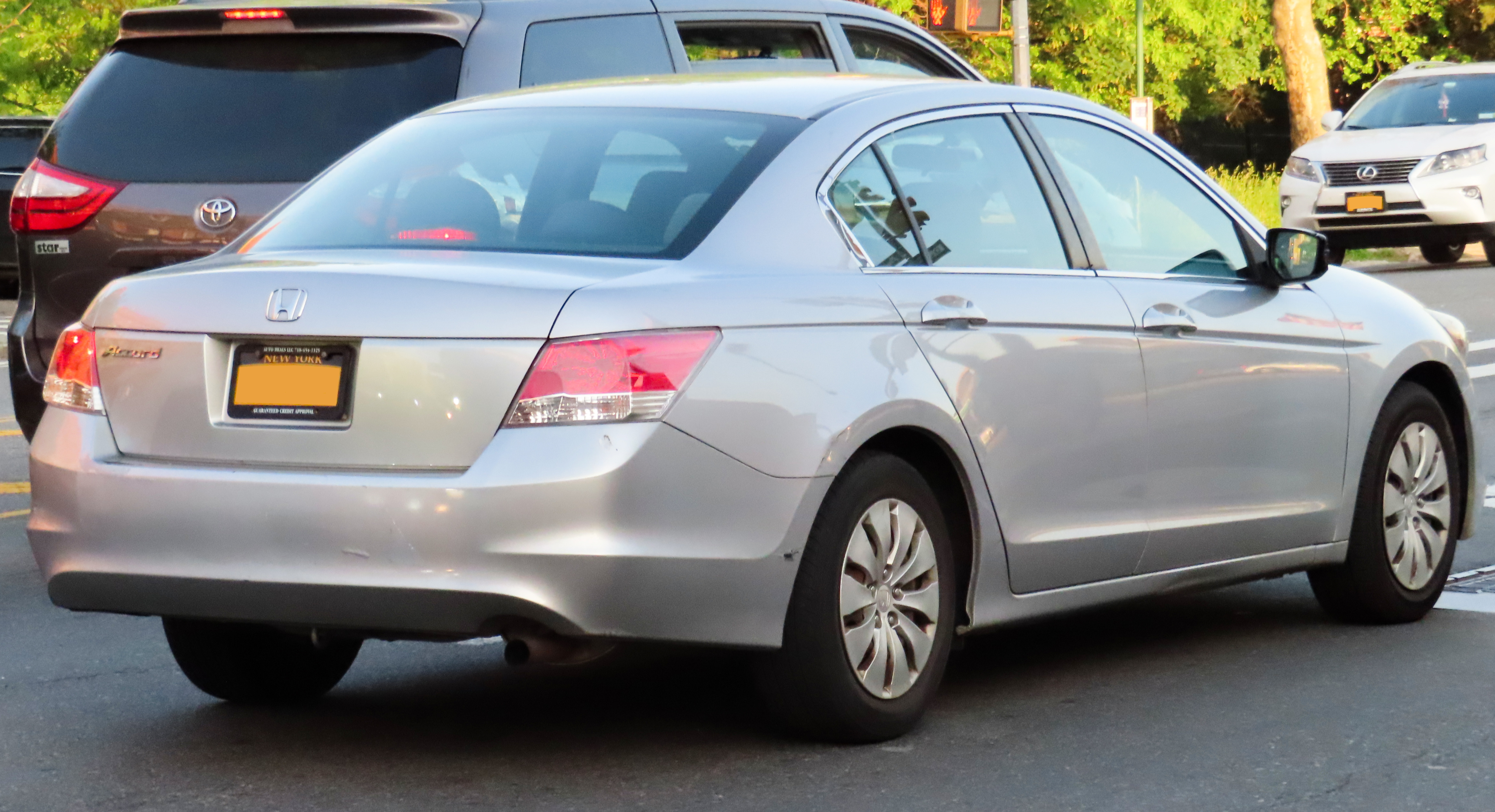
Pre-facelift Honda Accord LX sedan (US)

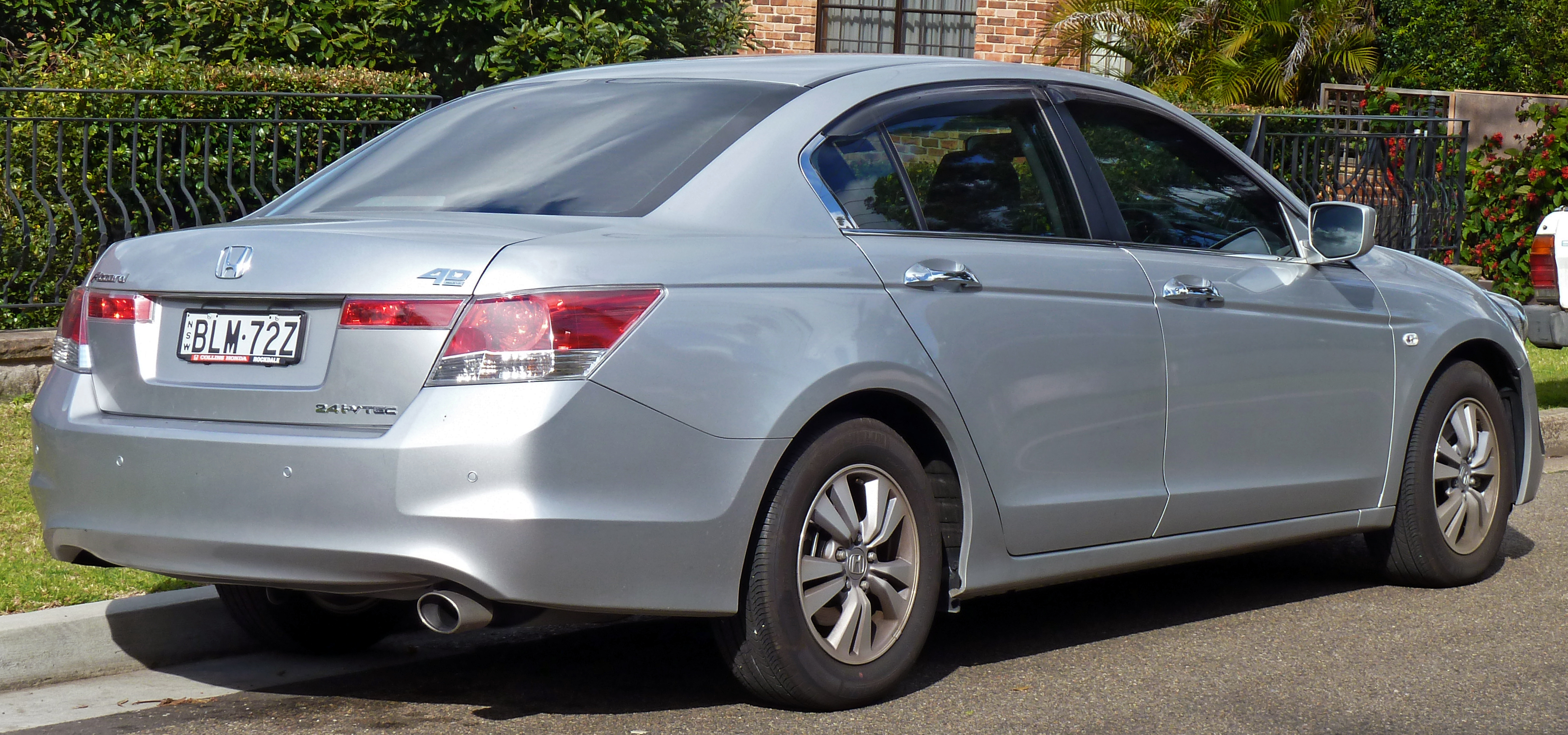
Pre-facelift Honda Accord 40th Anniversary sedan (Australia)

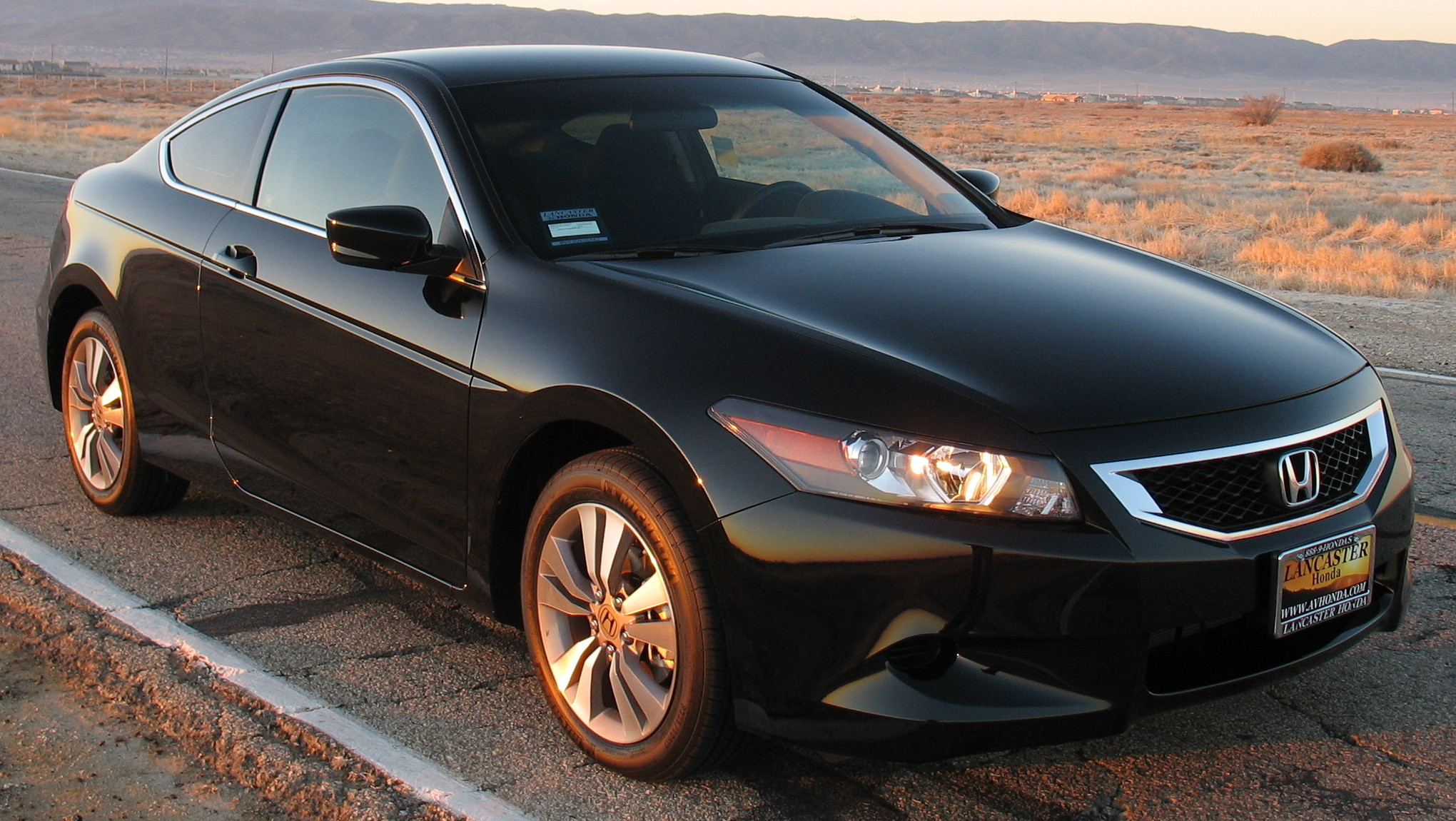
Pre-facelift Honda Accord coupe (US)

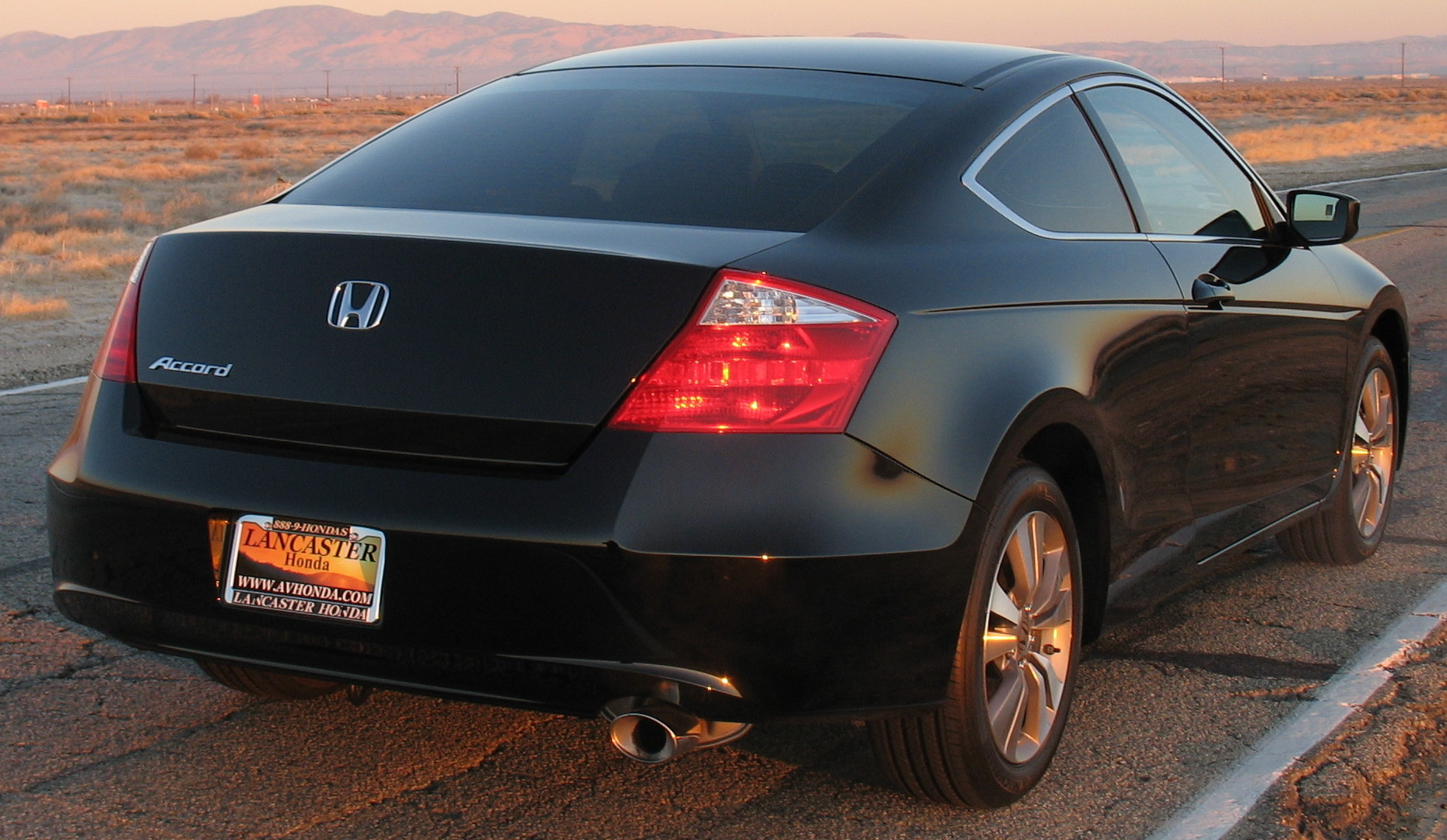
Pre-facelift Honda Accord coupe (US)

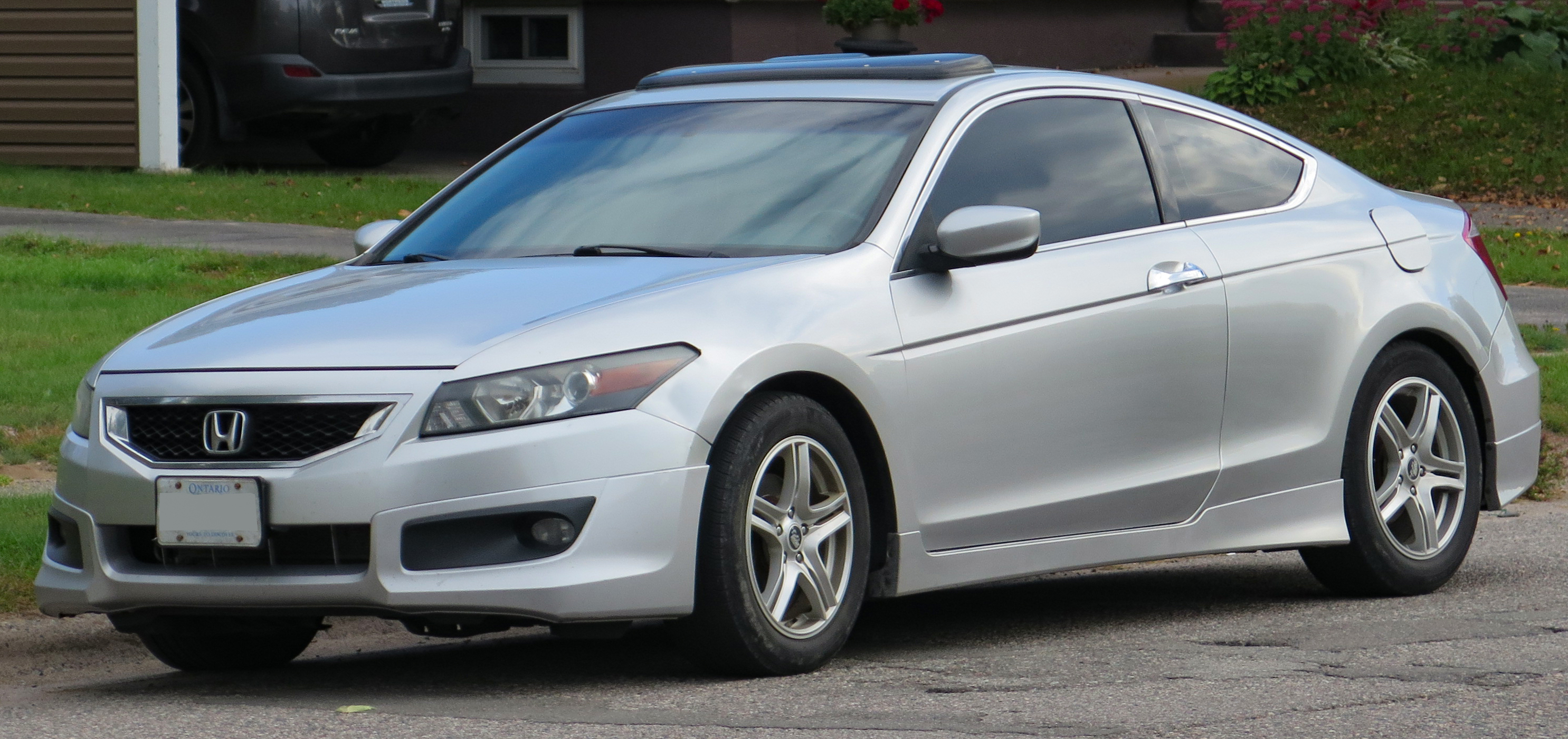
Pre-facelift Honda Accord EX-L V6 coupe with HFP package (Canada)

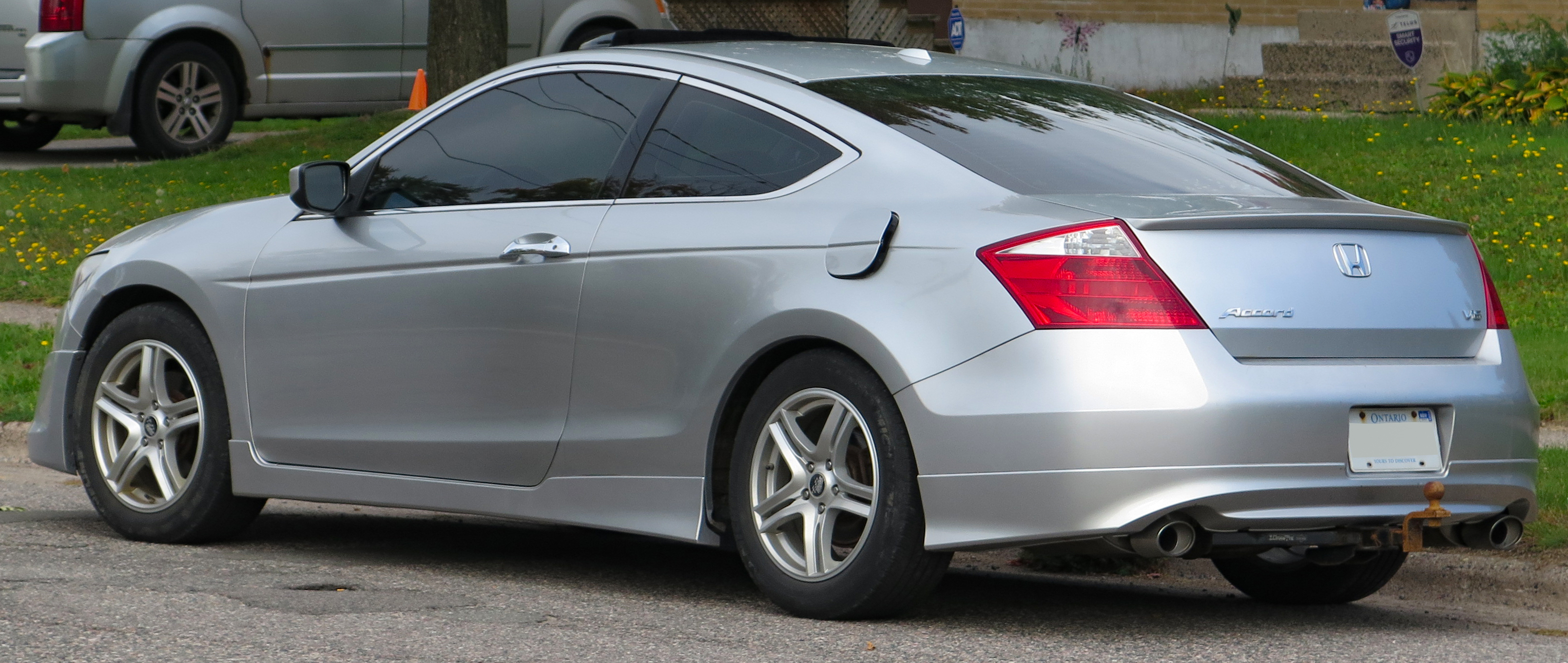
Pre-facelift Honda Accord EX-L V6 coupe with HFP package (Canada)

=== 2011 update ===
Both the Accord sedan and coupe received a facelift for the 2011 model year. Both cars feature new front fascias and updated tail lamps. The sedan features the reflective strips seen on the Japanese Honda Inspire. Inside, Honda has added steering wheel-mounted paddle shifters to the EX-L V6 Coupe, and USB connectivity for all coupe models and EX/EX-L sedans. A rearview camera is now standard with the available navigation system on the sedan. EX-L V6 models gain memory seats and all models get new cloth seats and some minor instrument panel and control modifications. In Canada a SE trim replaced the LX as the entry-level trim but was largely similar save for 16-inch alloy wheels. In the United States, a SE trim was slotted between the LX-P and EX, with the SE being largely similar to the LX-P but adding leather upholstery. New improved aerodynamics and a reworked five-speed automatic transmission help the Accord achieve 23 mpg (city) and 34 mpg (hwy).

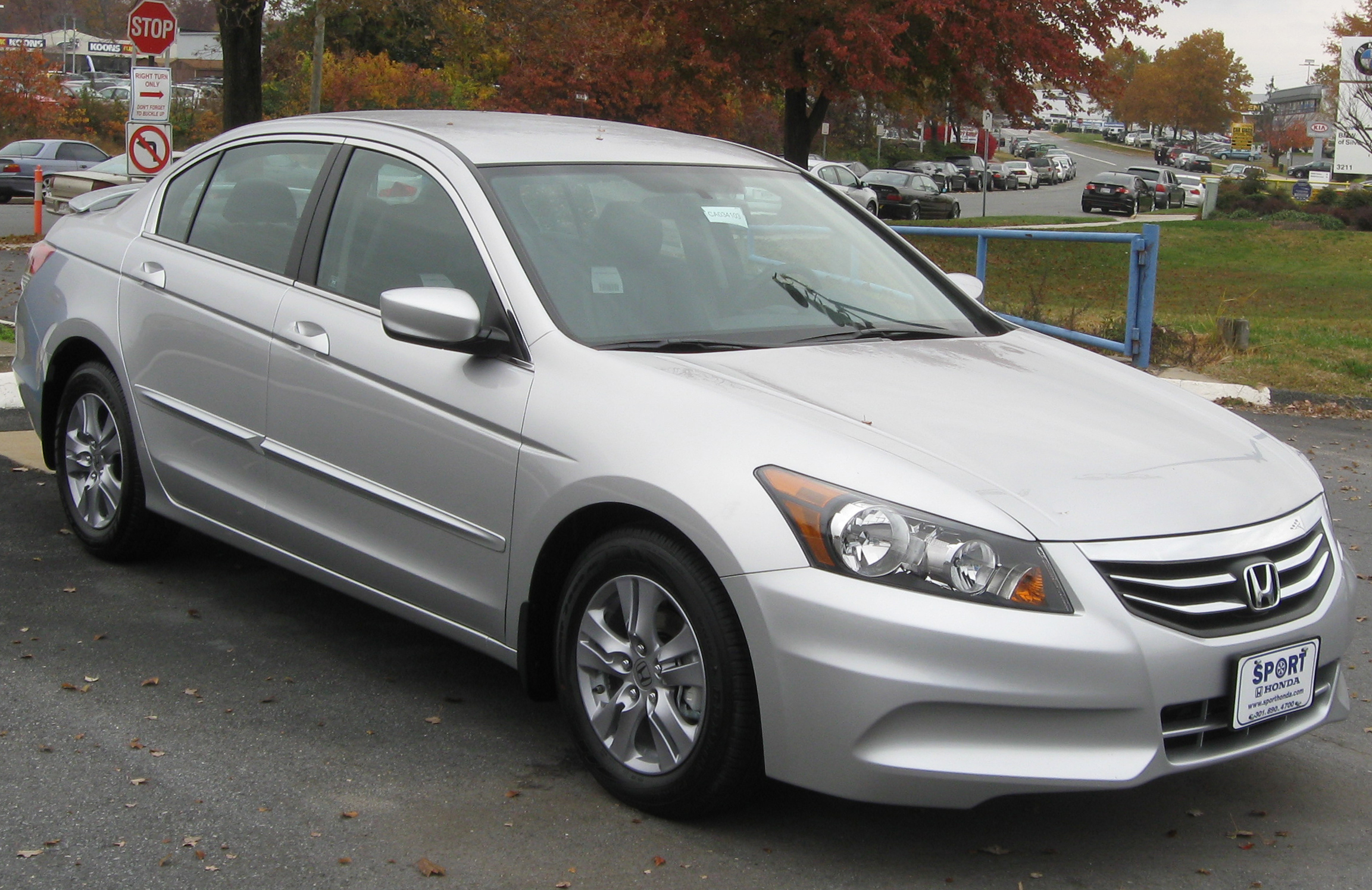
Facelift Honda Accord SE sedan (US)

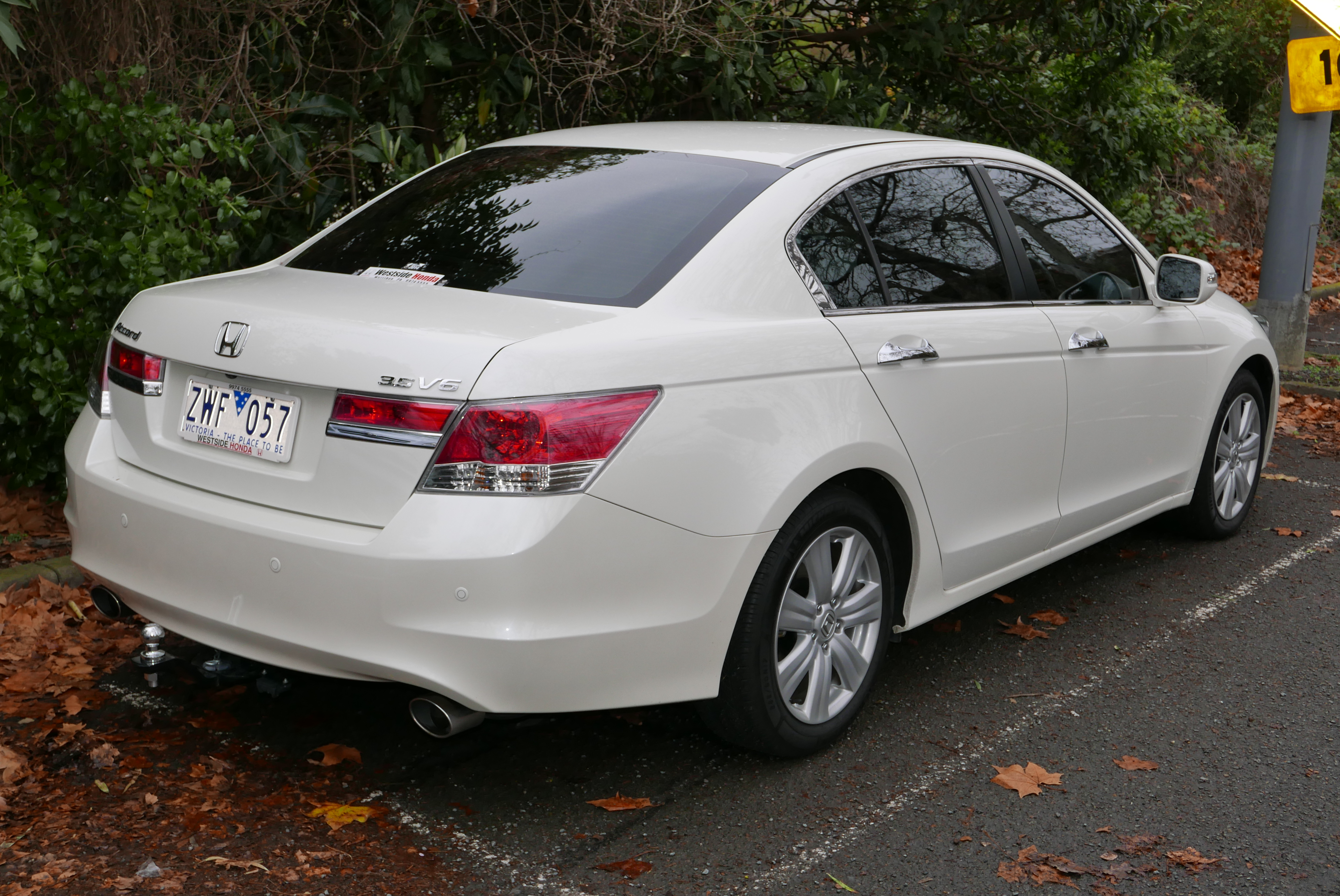
Facelift Honda Accord V6 Luxury sedan (Australia)

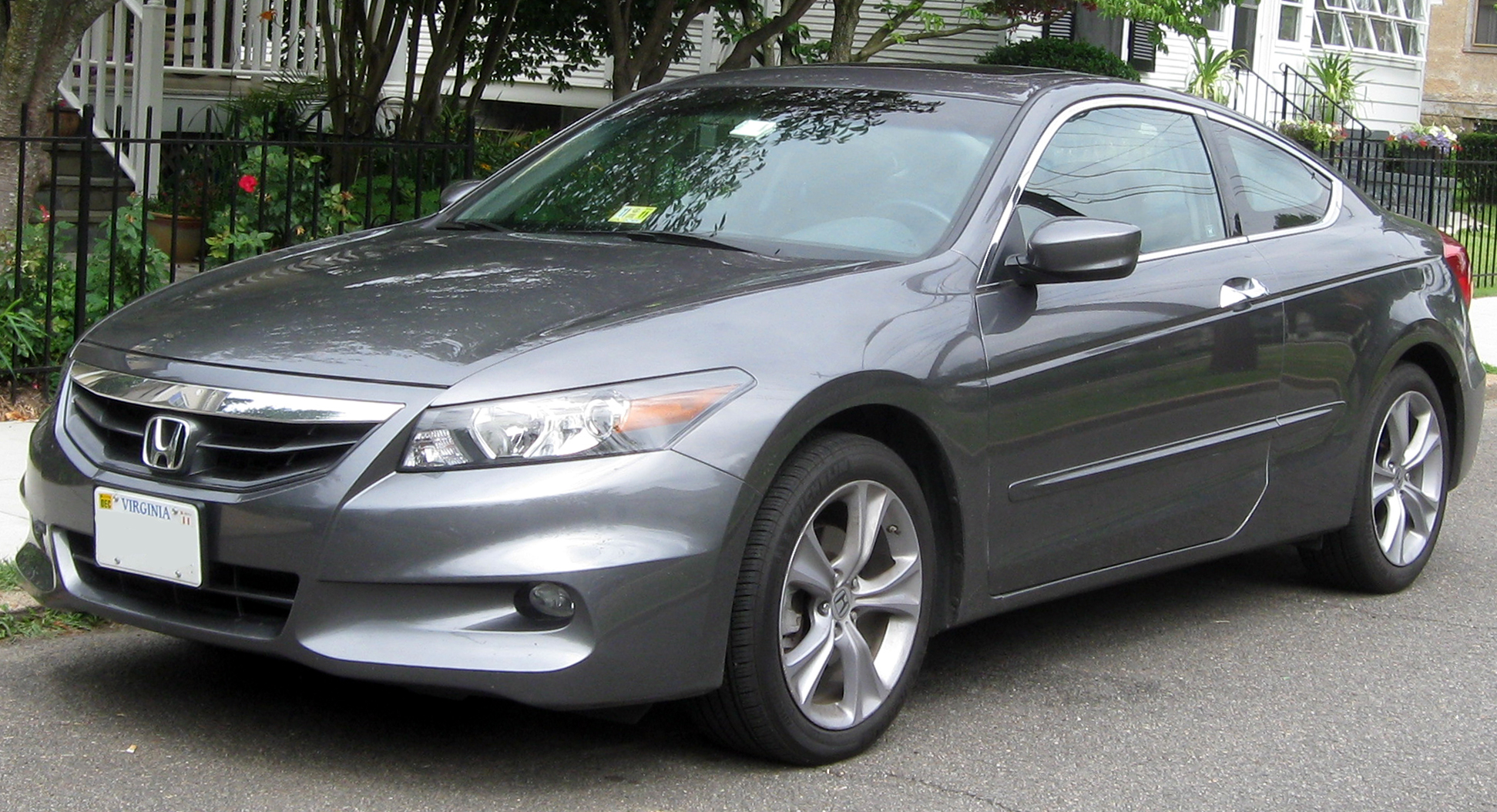
Facelift Honda Accord EX-L coupe (US)

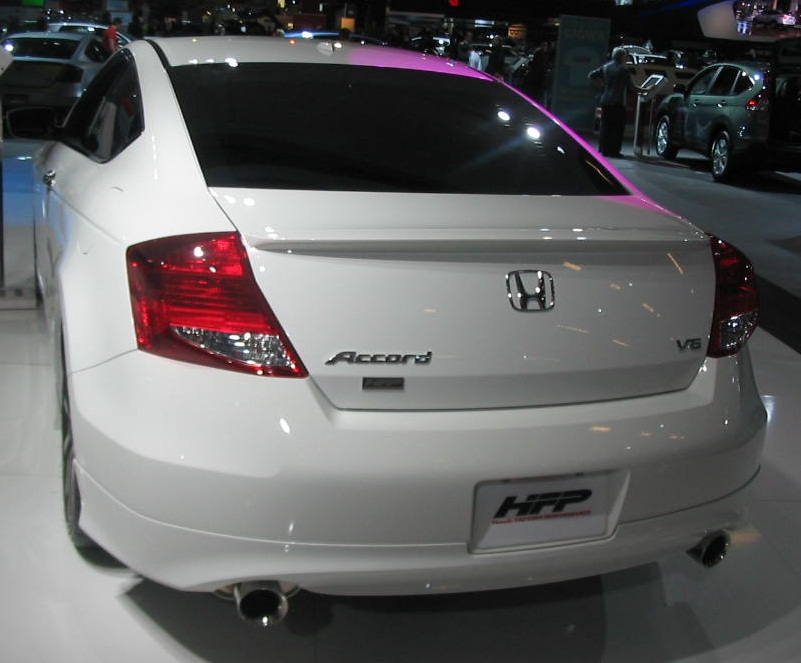
Facelift Honda Accord coupe (US)

=== Production (United States) ===
The North American 4-cylinder and V6 Accords were first assembled in Honda's Marysville Auto Plant in Marysville, Ohio. With the eighth generation, this plant became the sole global source of the Accord coupe. Beginning in mid-2009, the majority of the V6 Accord sedan production was moved to the Honda auto plant in Lincoln, Alabama. Honda's Anna, Ohio, Engine Plant produces the 4-cylinder engines. The US plants supply the majority of Accords to both North and South America.

== Global production and marketing ==
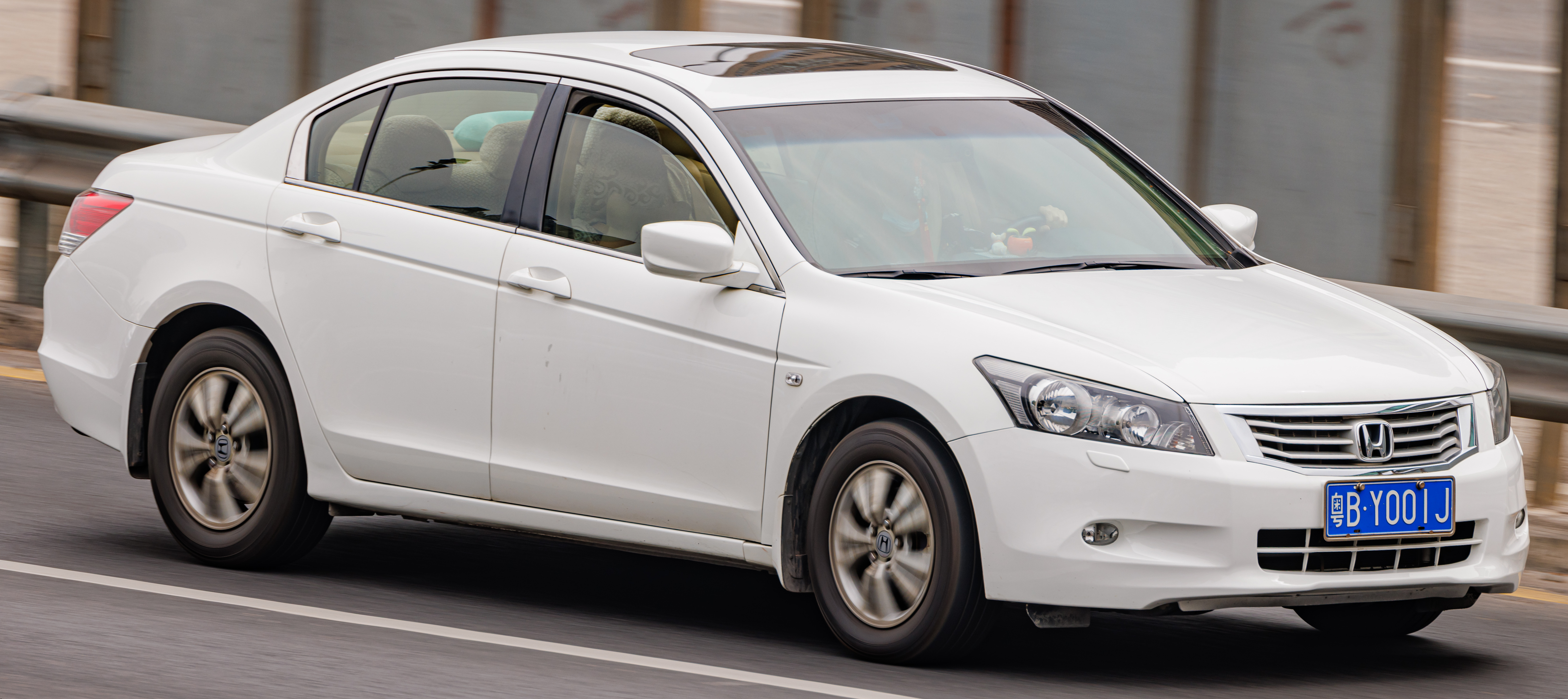
Chinese-made Guangqi Honda Accord

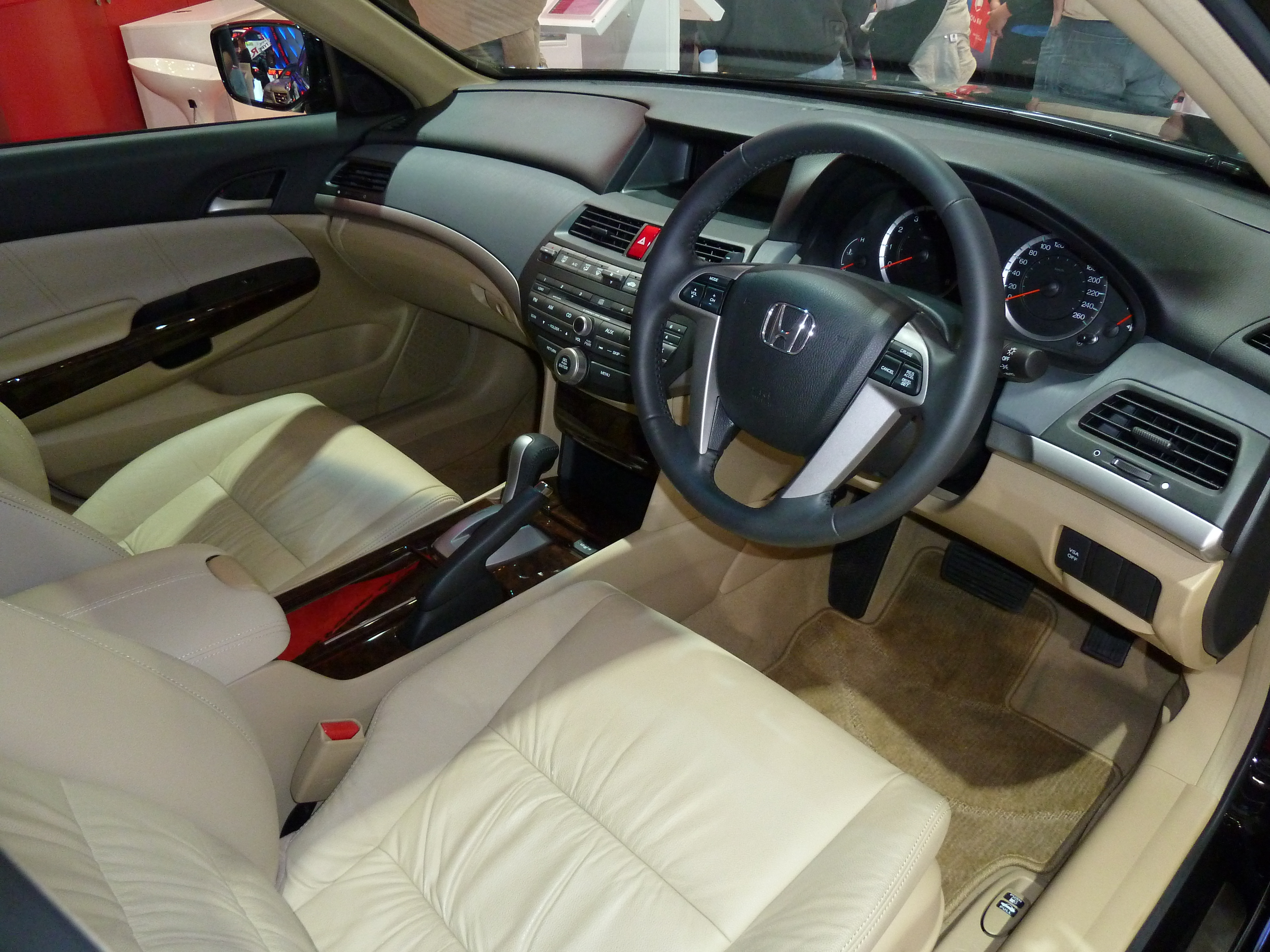
Interior

A right-hand-drive variant of the North American Accord model is sold as the fifth-generation Honda Inspire in Japan. In South Korea, the model was imported from Japan and success of the North American Accord pushed Honda ahead of BMW, Mercedes-Benz and Lexus, to become the number one import brand as sales of Honda vehicles surged 95% in the first seven months in that year.

Variants of the North American Accord models are manufactured for the domestic markets in China and Taiwan, with Guangzhou Honda (renamed Guangqi Honda in 2009) producing it since 2007.

The North American Accord model is also assembled in Thailand for sale in Southeast Asia, Australia and New Zealand. Since the North American Accord is sold alongside the Japanese-built Accord (European-spec) in the Australian and New Zealand markets under the same marque (as opposed to in Canada and the United States where the Euro-spec Accord is sold as the Acura TSX), the smaller of the two cars is badged as the Accord Euro, while in New Zealand only the V6-powered version of the North American Accord was available so it got badged as the Accord V6.

Honda entered a strategic collaboration with Proton of Malaysia in October 2012 as part of Japan's Abenomics plan. The result of the collaboration was the Proton Perdana, a rebadged eighth generation Honda Accord which launched on 11 December 2013, for exclusive sale to the Malaysian government and civil servants. It serves as the replacement to the ageing Mitsubishi Galant-based Proton Perdana V6 fleet in use since the 1990s.

The eighth generation of the Honda Accord went on sale in Middle Eastern markets in November 2007 as a 2008 model year vehicle; specifically, Honda officially launched the 8th generation Accord for the GCC market at a Dubai event on November 6, 2007, with Saudi Arabia releases by Abdullah Hashim Company Ltd. happening concurrently, offered with both a 2.4-liter engine and a 3.5-liter V6 engine option.

== Mechanical ==
=== Engines ===
Model	Years	Type/code	Power, torque at rpm
Accord LX/LX-P Sedan	2008-2012	2,354 cc (2.354 L; 143.6 cu in) DOHC i-VTEC I4 (K24Z2)	177 bhp (132 kW; 179 PS) at 6,500, 161 lb⋅ft (218 N⋅m) at 4,300
Accord EX/EX-L Sedan, LX-S/EX/EX-L Coupe	2008-2012	2,354 cc (2.354 L; 143.6 cu in) DOHC i-VTEC I4 (K24Z3)	190 bhp (140 kW; 190 PS) at 7,000, 162 lb⋅ft (220 N⋅m) at 4,400
Accord EX/EX-L V6 Sedan/Coupe 5AT	2008-	3,471 cc (3.471 L; 211.8 cu in) SOHC i-VTEC VCM V6 (J35Z2)	268 bhp (200 kW; 272 PS) at 6,200, 248 lb⋅ft (336 N⋅m) at 5,000
Accord EX/EX-L V6 Sedan/Coupe 5AT	2008-	3,471 cc (3.471 L; 211.8 cu in) SOHC i-VTEC VCM V6 (J35Z2)	271 bhp (202 kW; 275 PS) at 6,200, 254 lb⋅ft (344 N⋅m) at 5,000
Accord EX-L V6 Coupe 6MT	2008-	3,471 cc (3.471 L; 211.8 cu in) SOHC VTEC V6 (J35Z3)	268 bhp (200 kW; 272 PS) at 6,200, 248 lb⋅ft (336 N⋅m) at 5,000
Accord EX-L V6 Coupe 6MT	2008-	3,471 cc (3.471 L; 211.8 cu in) SOHC VTEC V6 (J35Z3)	271 bhp (202 kW; 275 PS) at 6,200, 251 lb⋅ft (340 N⋅m) at 5,000

The V6 i-VTEC VCM engines feature improved fuel efficiency due to the Variable Cylinder Management (VCM) system, which shuts off two or three of the cylinders depending on the type of driving (i.e. city driving, uphill/downhill driving, highway driving). Engines lacking VCM results in a decrease of 4 MPG in highway fuel economy.

The V6 engines were re-rated in 2009 model year.

=== Transmissions ===
Model	Years	Type
Accord LX/LX-P Sedan	2007-	5-speed manual, 5-speed automatic
Accord EX/EX-L Sedan, LX-S/EX/EX-L Coupe	2007-	5-speed manual, 5-speed automatic
Accord EX/EX-L V6 Sedan	2007-	5-speed automatic
Accord EX-L V6 Coupe	2007-	6-speed manual, 5-speed automatic

=== Chassis ===
The North American Accord uses the CP2 chassis code for the 2.4-liter 4-cylinder sedan and CS1 for the 4-cylinder coupe. CP3 is for the V6 sedan and CS2 is for the V6 coupe. CP1 is for the 2.0-liter 4-cylinder sedan in the Chinese and Brazilian markets.

== Safety ==
The Accord comes standard with a wide range of safety features carried over from earlier model years including dual stage, dual threshold front airbags, side impact airbags, side curtain airbags, and seat belts with front pretensioners and load limiters.

The Accord standard safety updates for the 2008 model year include vehicle stability assist (VSA) and traction control, anti-lock brakes with brake assist and electronic brake force distribution, tire pressure monitoring system, active front head restraints, new dual chamber side impact airbags, and the ACE Body Structure for all models. The Accord is the first mid-size car in its class to include stability and traction control as standard equipment across the lineup.

=== IIHS ===
In Insurance Institute for Highway Safety (IIHS) tests the Accord sedan received the top "Good" rating in 13 of 14 measured categories, while receiving an "Acceptable" rating in the structure/safety cage category of the side impact test, earning it a "Top Safety Pick" designation from the IIHS, an honor not bestowed upon most of the Accord's competitors. The Accord lost this award due to its "Acceptable" score in roof strength evaluations. 2012 models have been given the Top Safety Pick award back with its "Good" rating in the roof strength test.

In an IIHS study of vehicle fatalities, the Accord was found to have the lowest vehicle fatality rate in the non-luxury midsize sedan class. Among luxury midsize sedan class models only the Saab 9-3 had a lower fatality rate.

IIHS sedan scores:
Moderate overlap frontal offset	Good
Side impact	Good
Roof strength	Acceptable (2008-11 models)
Roof strength	Good (2012 models)

=== NHTSA ===
NHTSA 2009 Accord sedan:
Frontal Driver:	5/5 stars
Frontal Passenger:	5/5 stars
Side Driver:	5/5 stars
Side Passenger:	5/5 stars
Side Rear Passenger:	3/5 stars
Rollover:	5/5 stars

NHTSA 2011 Accord sedan:
Overall:	5/5 stars
Frontal Driver:	5/5 stars
Frontal Passenger:	5/5 stars
Side Driver:	4/5 stars
Side Passenger:	5/5 stars
Side Pole Driver:	5/5 stars
Rollover:	5/5 stars

=== Brake wear class action lawsuit ===
In September 2009, a class action was filed alleging that "the braking system on 2008, 2009, and certain 2010 Honda Accord vehicles as well as 2009 and certain 2010 Acura TSX vehicles ... suffers from a defect that causes excessive force to be applied to the vehicles' rear wheels. One consequence of this defect is that the vehicles' rear brake pads wear out and require replacement about every 15,000 to 20,000 miles, far more frequently than in a properly functioning braking system." On April 6, 2010, a preliminary settlement to the class action was announced where Honda would reimburse owners for a portion of their prior brake repair expenses, and Honda would also pay up to $150 for owners to have redesigned brake pads installed. Final court approval of the settlement was granted on July 29, 2010.

=== Sudden Airbag Deployment Recall ===
Some 2008-2009 Honda Accords - both coupe and sedan - have been reported to have sudden airbag deployment problems, in which the side curtain airbags on the passenger side deploy unexpectedly either by closing the passenger side doors, or while the vehicle is in motion. Honda initially refused to cover the issue under warranty or issue any recalls, claiming to customers that there was no defect in the airbags, and that the system worked properly (despite customers' counterclaims), forcing customers to pay for the airbags themselves. At least 14 injuries were reported by such unexpected deployments. In January 2014, Honda agreed to cooperate with an engineering analysis launched by the NHTSA after receiving 300 complaints regarding the inadvertent deployments. On August 4, 2014, the NHTSA upgraded their analysis to a preliminary investigation of at least 335,195 2008 Accords to see if Honda should issue a recall. In October 2015, Honda agreed to recall 300,000 Accords after discovering that the unexpected deployments were caused by a software problem in the vehicle airbag control unit.

== Awards and reception ==
The eighth generation Accord has received mostly positive reviews, with some comparing its Germanic-looking styling to the BMW 3 Series and 5 Series. In its March 2008 issue, Car and Driver placed the 2008 Honda Accord EX first in a comparison test of four-cylinder mid-size sedans against the then recently redesigned/updated Toyota Camry, Nissan Altima, Chevrolet Malibu, Hyundai Sonata, and Dodge Avenger, as well as the Ford Fusion. Edmunds.com InsideLine also placed the LX-P and EX-L V6 Navi sedans first in a comparison against the Nissan Altima, Toyota Camry, and Chevrolet Malibu, praising it for its all-around performance, high build quality, responsive handling, and excellent fuel economy. However, MotorTrend magazine criticized the Accord for being too heavy, feeling not so nimble as the previous model, its polarizing appearance, and for its less-than-stellar showing against the considerably improved Chevrolet Malibu in their 2008 Car of the Year competition. Car and Driver also ranked the Accord EX-L first in a comparison against the second-generation Mazda6 and 2010 Ford Fusion, and the 2011 Honda Accord EX-L V6 has fared well against the newer 2012 Volkswagen Passat 3.6 SEL and the 2012 Hyundai Sonata 2.0T Limited. In a March 2012 comparison test by Car and Driver, the Accord came in second place out of six cars behind the first place Volkswagen Passat.

Several reviewers have considered the Accord Coupe superior to its primary competition, the Nissan Altima Coupe, in all categories such as passenger space, dynamics, and overall refinement.

The Accord is the top pick mid-size vehicle in the Consumer Reports rankings, due to its standard stability control despite having a slightly lower score than the Nissan Altima, while Consumer Guide has named the Accord a "Best Buy". The Accord also won Car and Driver's 10Best trophy in 2008 and 2009, a total of 23 times in the nameplate's history, winning it more times than any other vehicle by far. US sales have been up 9.4%, as SUV buyers shift to the V6 Accord. The 2008 - 2011 Honda Accord was awarded a best-in-class rating of 4 1/2 stars by the JB car pages. The Accord was the most-searched vehicle on CarMax for the fourth consecutive year, due to its high marks in both reliability and comfort.
