= Proton E01 engine =

The Proton E01 engine, formerly known as the Petronas E01 engine, was an automobile gasoline engine by the Malaysian carmaker, Proton. Originally developed by the Malaysian oil company Petronas in 1997, the engine patents were acquired by Proton in 2012. The engine was planned to be reworked in order to meet the upcoming Euro 6C, as the original engine was designed for Euro 2 standard. The E01 engine was meant to become one of the upcoming seven engines being developed by Proton as successors of the CamPro engine family, which was expected to be ready in 2017, although to this day is not yet finished.

== Technical specifications ==
The E01 engine is a 2-litre DOHC 16-valve engine featuring gasoline direct injection, aluminum block and continuous variable valve timing system. The engine is capable to produce 204.3 PS (150.3 kW) of power at 7,300 rpm and 203 N⋅m (150 ft⋅lbf) of torque at 5,300 rpm. The E01 engine can be installed 15 degrees tilting forward or backward of the engine compartment. Besides the initial 2-litre engine, the E01 engine can also be configured to spawn 1.8-litre and 2.2-litre variants.

When the E01 engine was developed by Petronas, the engine was designed to meet the Euro 2 emission standard. As a result, Proton is currently reworking the engine, in addition to the development of an all-new family of six engines, to meet the upcoming Euro 6C standard.

== History ==
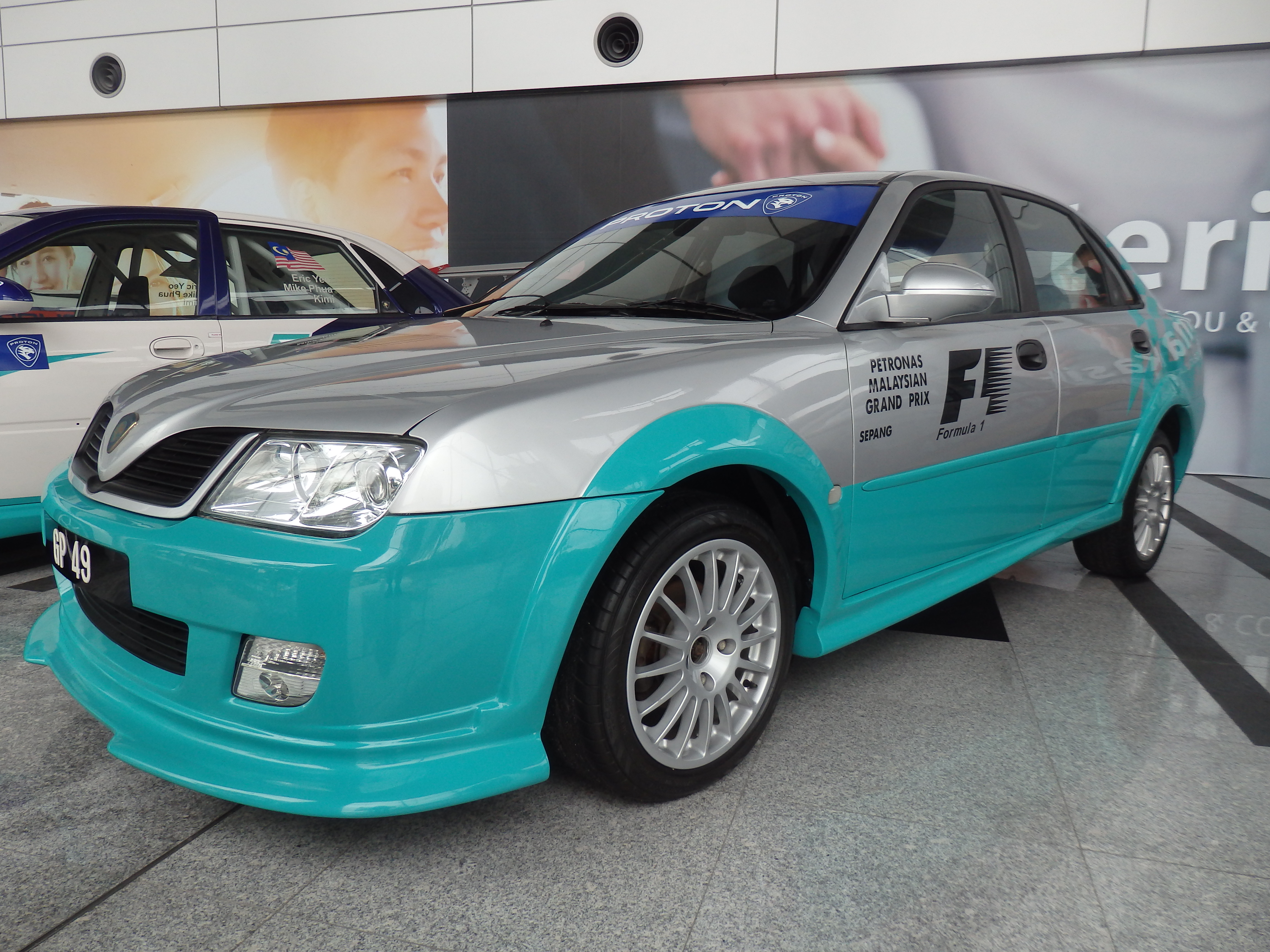
A Proton Waja with the E01 engine at Proton's Centre of Excellence.

The E01 engine was originally developed by Sauber Petronas Engineering, a 60:40 joint-venture between Petronas and Sauber. It was the first commercial automotive engine in Malaysia. The development of the engine started in March 1997, with the engine start-up ceremony being held on 20 February 1998. The engine was intended to be supplied to Proton; however, Proton had ultimately opted for their self-designed CamPro engines instead to be used in their upcoming models. Only 6 known cars were fitted with the Petronas E01 engine - 2 Series 1 Lotus Elise, a Proton Perdana, a Proton Putra, a Proton Satria GTi and a Proton Waja.

After the first failed attempt to sell the engine patents to Proton, Petronas was looking for other carmakers who were willing to buy the engine patents. In 2005, a Chinese carmaker Nanjing Automobile was interested to buy the engine patents. A letter of intent was signed on 2 September 2005. Nanjing Automobile also had set up a plan to mass-produce the E01 engine; however, the plan did not materialize at all.

It was not until 2006 that Proton intended to take over the patents of the E01 engine. A memorandum of intention was signed by both parties on 29 January 2006. However, the patent purchase was only finalized in 2012, as Petronas decided to exit from all engine development activities since 2010. The engine patent purchase provided Proton with an immediate ownership of a family of powertrains consisting of 2.0-litre and 2.2-litre engines in normally-aspirated and turbocharged variants. Besides, the ownership of the E01 engine patents also enabled Proton to derive the gasoline direct injection technology which would also be applied to their own Proton GDi engine family.

With the patents of the E01 engine being acquired from Petronas, the E01 engine becomes one of the two upcoming engine families to succeed the CamPro engine which was in service since 2004 via the Proton Gen-2. Both engine families are expected to be debuted by the end of 2017.

== See also ==
- CamPro engine - the first self-developed engine family by Proton
- Proton GDi engine - another new engine family being self-developed as successors of the CamPro engine family
