= Malaysia–Turkey relations =

- Turkey: Malaysia

Diplomatic mission
- Embassy of Turkey, Kuala Lumpur: Embassy of Malaysia, Ankara

Malaysia–Turkey relations are the foreign relations between Malaysia and Turkey. Turkey has an embassy in Kuala Lumpur, and Malaysia has an embassy in Ankara and consulate-general in Istanbul. Both countries are full members of the World Trade Organization (WTO) and the Organisation of the Islamic Conference (OIC). Both countries are also classified as regional powers and middle powers in their respective regions.

== History ==
The relations between the two countries can be traced back during the Malay sultanate era and the Ottoman Empire. In the 16th century, the Ottoman Empire supported Aceh against Johor. From the 19th century, relations between the Malay Sultanates and the Ottomans remained intact, bolstered by close personal ties between Sultan Abu Bakar of Johor, who made several visits to Istanbul. On the occasion of Sultan Abu Bakar's visit in 1890, he and his brother, Engku Abdul Majid, married Turkish women. These marriages has further strengthened the bilateral relationship and produced a mixed Malay-Turkish descendants such as Syed Muhammad Naquib al-Attas and Ungku Aziz. Today, the modern relations of both countries has started since 1964. Prime Minister Najib Razak visited Turkey on 17 April 2014 to extend bilateral trades between the two countries and signed FTA. Some economic agreements has been established between the two countries such as Strategic Framework Agreement and Free Trade Agreement. Besides that, the visa requirements for both countries visits also has been abolished.

== Economic relations ==
Both countries are also currently forging greater co-operation in trade and investment, especially linkages in the Islamic financial industry between the two markets. Turkey is also currently looking on Malaysia to become one of its main trading partners in the ASEAN region. In 2019, as part of the plan to improve ties with Asian nations, Turkey plans to boost its investment in Malaysia where the latter also have been considered as among 17 countries under focus for exports as had been expressed by Turkish Trade Minister Ruhsar Pekcan in August.

== Security relations ==
The Turkish defense industry company has signed several accords with Malaysian partner which was worth around $600 million deal for armored vehicles production. The other Turkish firms also have signed deals with Malaysian partners to modernize the Malaysian military systems.

On 12 May 2017, Malaysia deported three Turkish suspects over their alleged involvement with the Gülen movement, an organization which has been designated as a terrorist organization by the Turkish government. Following this, the Malaysian government was accused by the anti-Erdogan Stockholm Center for Freedom (SCF) for enabling the persecution of government critics of the administration under President Recep Tayyip Erdoğan by unlawfully turning over Turkish nationals who fled from the crackdown launched by their President under the request of their government. Deputy Prime Minister of Malaysia Ahmad Zahid Hamidi denied the detention was based on order from the Turkish government, while explaining that the arrests were made after receiving information from the Counter-Messaging Centre (CMC) in relation to their involvement in an organisation that deemed illegal in their country.

== Resident diplomatic missions ==
- Malaysia has an embassy in Ankara and a consulate-general in Istanbul.
- Turkey has an embassy in Kuala Lumpur.

== See also ==
- Foreign relations of Malaysia
- Foreign relations of Turkey
