= Proton Perdana (first generation) =

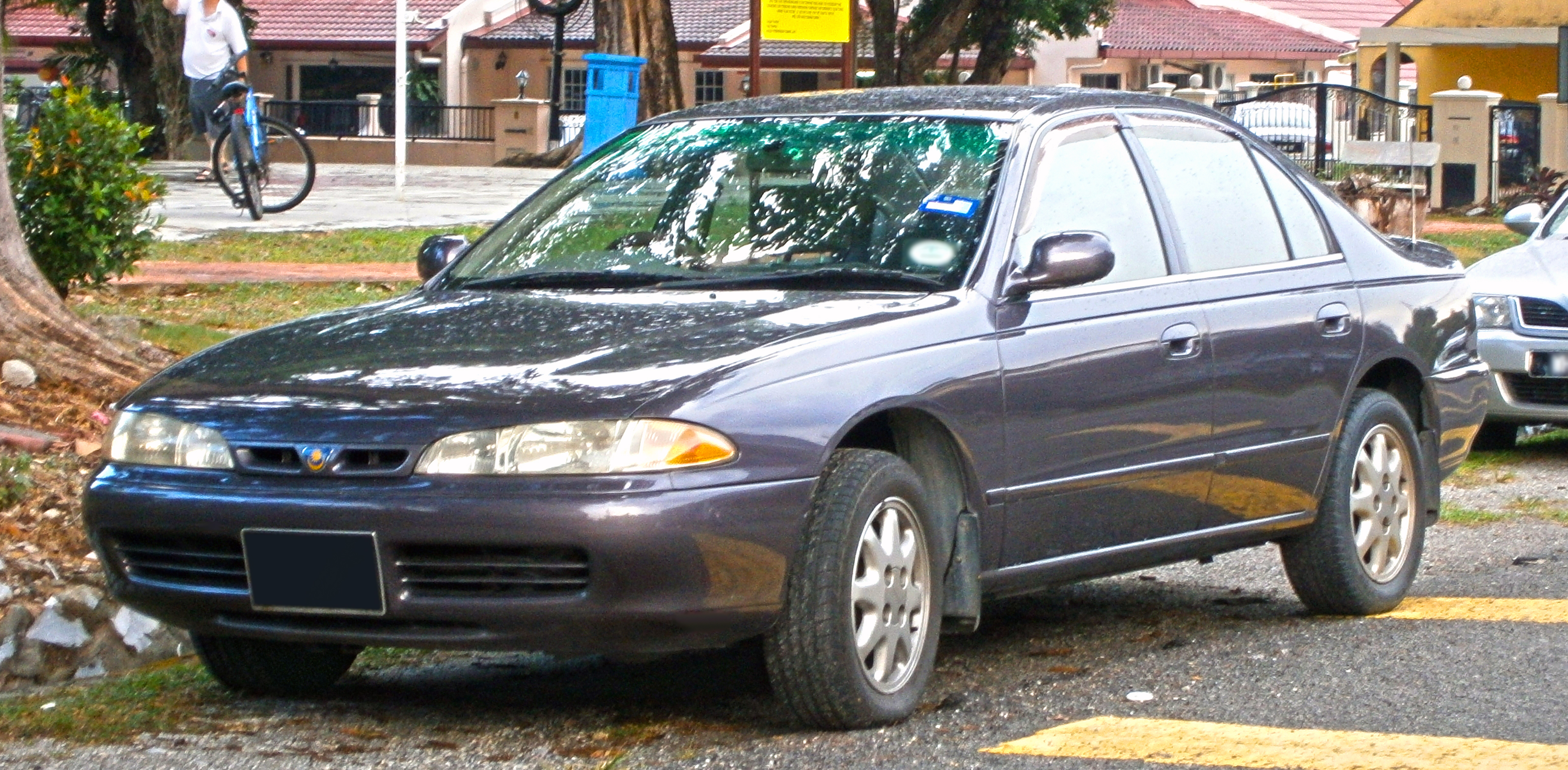
- 1995 Proton Perdana

Overview
- Manufacturer: Proton
- Production: January 1995 – August 2010
- Assembly: Malaysia: Shah Alam, Selangor (PONSB)

Body and chassis
- Class: Mid-size family / D-segment
- Body style: 4-door saloon
- Layout: Front-engine, front-wheel drive
- Platform: Mitsubishi Eterna
- Related: Mitsubishi Eterna

Powertrain
- Engine: 2.0 L 4G63 SOHC I4 (1995–1998); 2.0 L 6A12 DOHC V6 (1998–2010)
- Transmission: 5-speed manual 4-speed automatic

Dimensions
- Wheelbase: 2,635 mm (103.7 in) (Standard)
- Length: 4,640 mm (182.7 in) (Standard); 4,890 mm (192.5 in) (Executive); 5,300 mm (208.7 in) (S. Limousine); 5,550 mm (218.5 in) (E. Limousine)
- Width: 1,730 mm (68.1 in)
- Height: 1,400 mm (55.1 in)
- Kerb weight: 1,005–1,300 kg (2,216–2,866 lb) (Standard)

Chronology
- Successor: Proton Perdana (second generation)

The first generation Proton Perdana is a four-door mid-size family saloon manufactured by Malaysian automobile producer Proton which launched on 26 January 1995. It is a badge engineered seventh generation Mitsubishi Eterna, developed as the result of a collaboration between Proton and Mitsubishi Motors. About 80,000 first generation Proton Perdanas were sold between 1995 and 2013.

Perdana is the Malay word for Prime. The Perdana proved expensive to run and had reliability issues; the Malaysian government opted to replace it with the Honda Accord for federal and deputy ministers. The Accord ended up being built by Proton as the second generation Perdana.

== History ==
=== Proton Perdana (1995–1998) ===
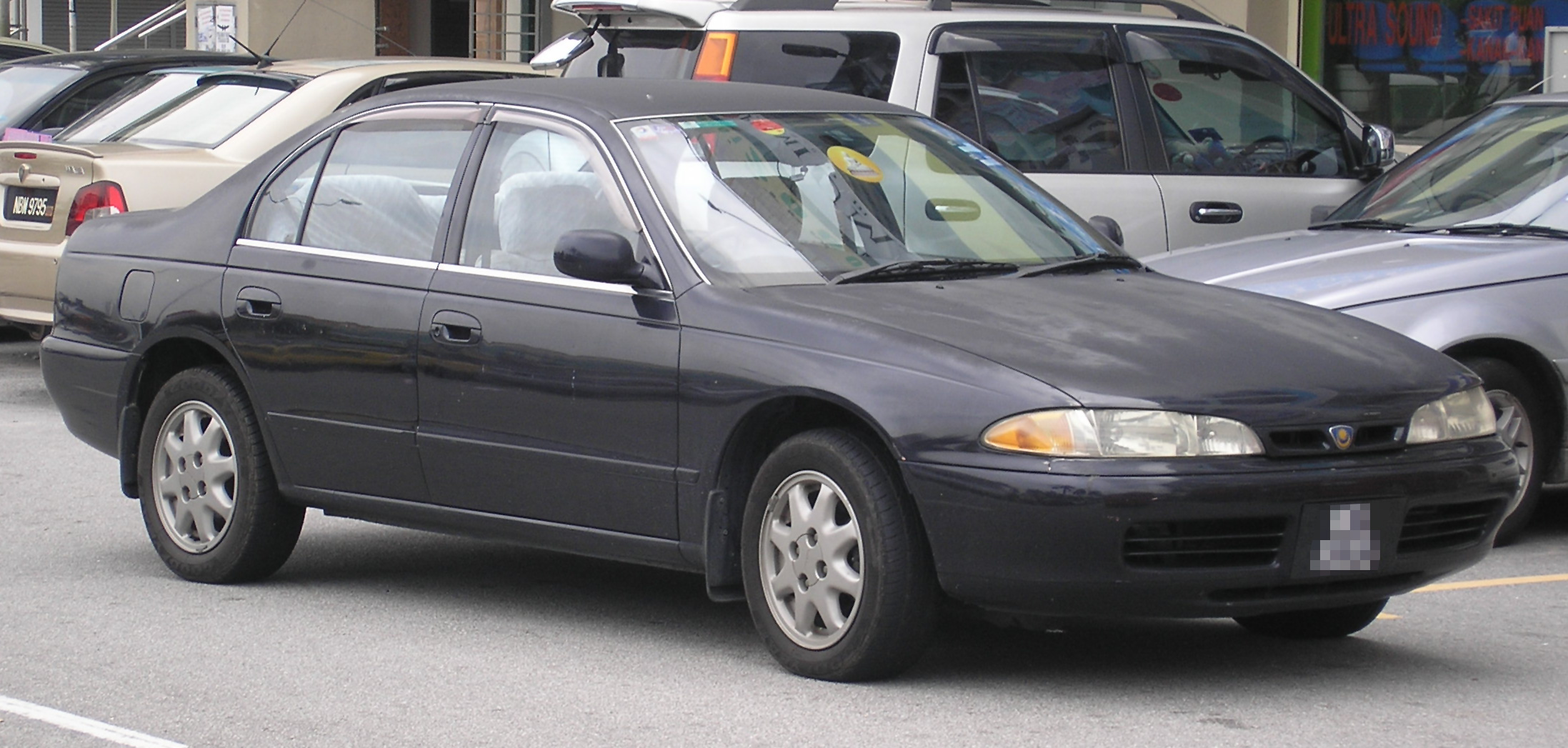
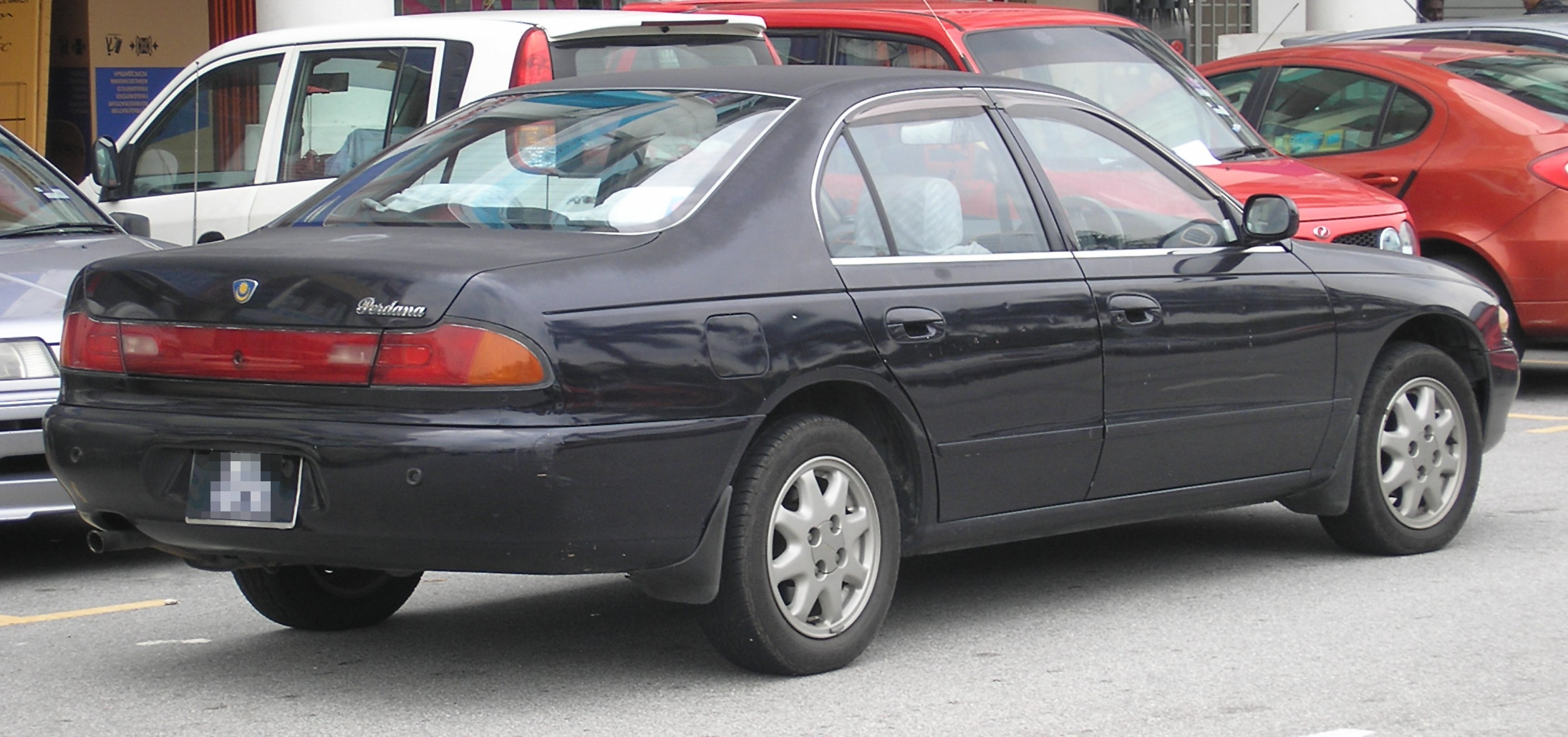
1995–1998 Proton Perdana

The Malaysian economy grew at an average of 8% each year between the late 1980s and the first half of the 1990s. Proton identified the need for a larger, more luxurious D-segment car after the launch of the B-segment Proton Saga and C-segment Proton Wira in 1985 and 1993 respectively. When it launched on 26 January 1995, the Proton Perdana became Malaysia's first car to compete against the Toyota Camry, Honda Accord and Nissan Cefiro. The Perdana was the third car developed under Proton's extensive collaboration with Mitsubishi Motors. It is based on the seventh generation Mitsubishi Eterna platform and shares a vast majority of parts with the JDM-spec Eterna, receiving only minor internal and external changes for the Malaysian market. The Perdana features Mitsubishi's 4G63 16-valve 2.0 litre straight-four engine multi-point fuel injected engine which is capable of producing 135 PS (99 kW; 133 hp) at 6000 rpm and 176 Nm of torque at 4750 rpm. It was initially offered with a four-speed automatic and a five-speed manual transmissions, but the manual variant was discontinued in 1996. The Perdana sported a very low drag coefficient of Cd=0.29, allowing for improved fuel efficiency and a top speed in excess of 200 km/h. The Perdana also became Proton's first car to be offered with an anti-lock braking system (ABS) and cruise control, and among the earliest of Protons to be equipped with all-round power windows, power folding mirrors and a headlight levelling system.

Proton struggled to meet the overwhelming demand for the Perdana upon its January 1995 launch, with a waiting period of over six months. The Perdana cost around RM85,000 at launch, but there were reports of relatively new second-hand Perdana units appreciating up to 12%, or RM95,000. Nonetheless, Proton still captured 47% of the 2,000cc and above segment in its domestic market, with 9,000 units sold over the course of 14 months.

In 1997, the Perdana was given a minor facelift, offering a chrome-plated grille, redesigned alloy rims, as well as additional colour options and upgraded interior trimmings.

A bulletproof edition of the Proton Perdana was used in the shuttling of the Heads of Government during the 1998 Asia-Pacific Economic Cooperation (APEC) summit in Kuala Lumpur.

=== Proton Perdana V6 (1998–2010) ===
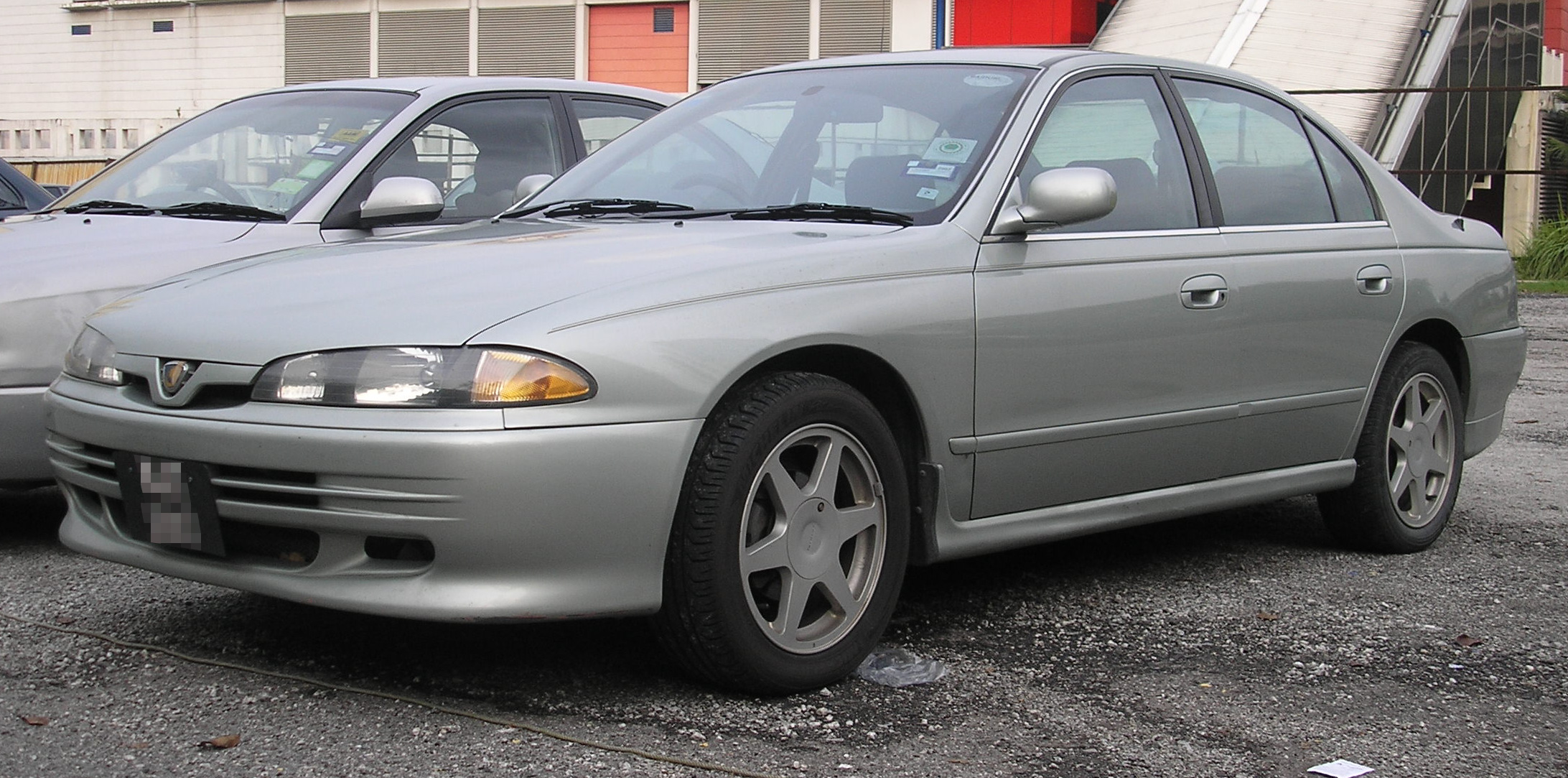
1998–2002 Proton Perdana V6

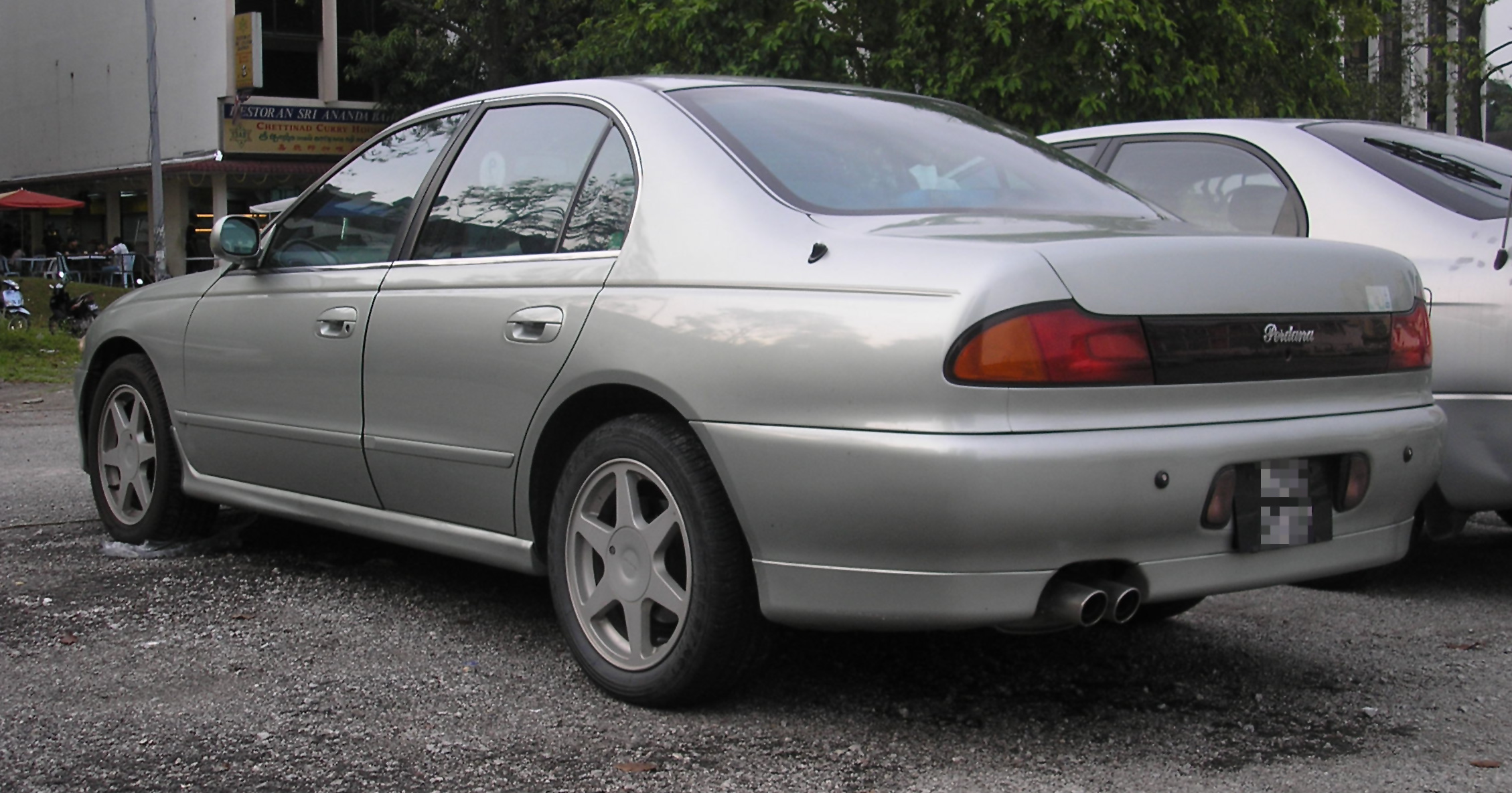
1998–2002 Proton Perdana V6

On 12 November 1998, Proton unveiled the Proton Perdana V6 at Stadium Putra, Bukit Jalil. The Proton Perdana V6 is the same as the original Perdana, but equipped with the superior 24-valve Mitsubishi 6A12 2.0L V6 engine which offers 150 PS (110 kW; 148 bhp), or 13 hp more than the previous 16-valve Mitsubishi 4G63 2.0L straight-four engine. The Perdana V6 received additional ride & handling input from Proton's British subsidiary, Lotus, resulting in improved NVH attributes. It also featured a new bodykit, grille, 16" rims, leather seats, a redesigned steering wheel and other minor updates on the interior and two exterior colours; silver and black. The original Perdana was sold alongside the V6 variant, but it was eventually discontinued in early 2000.

Proton had also introduced the Perdana V6 in neighbouring Brunei and Singapore on 11 and 22 June 1999 respectively.

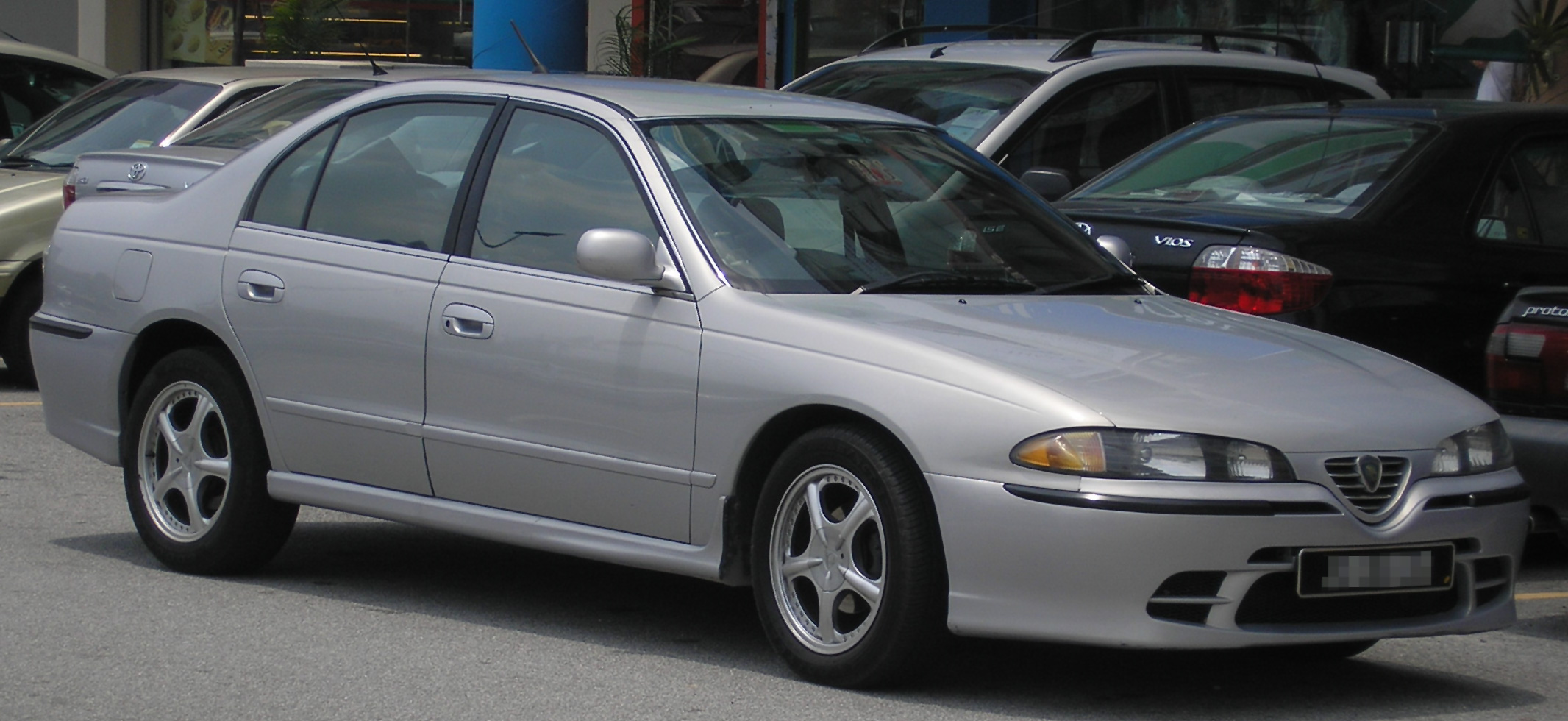
2003–2010 Proton Perdana V6

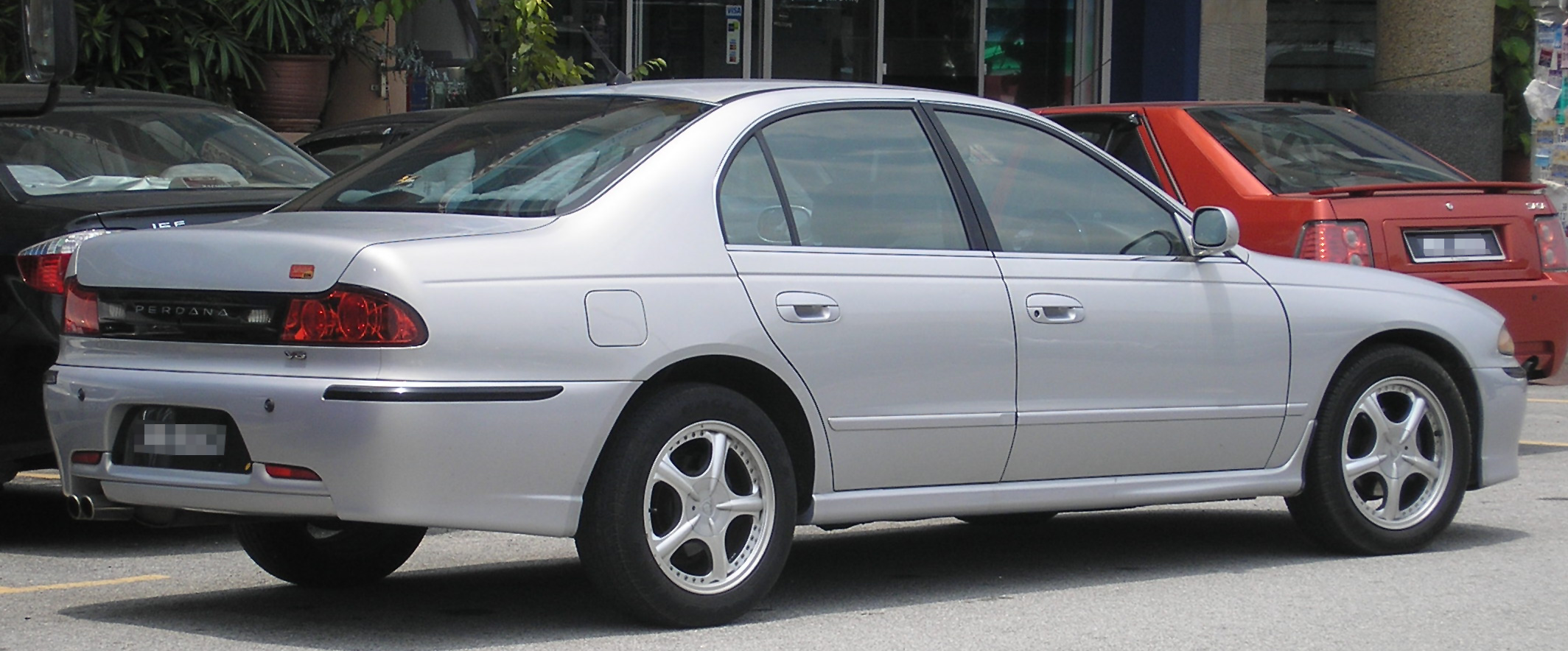
2003–2010 Proton Perdana V6

The Perdana V6 was given a major facelift on 26 January 2003. It received a new front grille similar to an Alfa Romeo, front and rear bumpers, 16-inch alloy rims, tail lights and reverse lamps which were repositioned to the boot. Interior-wise, it featured a new steering wheel, redesigned leather seats and new aluminium-effect trim panels. The mechanical aspects of the car remained unchanged. From 2005 onwards, the Perdana V6 was offered with a new cream coloured interior option and more alluring nine-spoke 16" rims. This iteration remained on sale up until early 2010.

Proton managed to sell more than 77,178 units of the Perdana. Of the total sold, the 2.0 litre 6A12 V6 variant was the most commercially successful at between 50,000 and 55,000 sold whereas the 2.0 litre 4G63 I4 managed around 24,370, of which 11,570 and 9,617 were SEi and GLi automatic models, while the remaining 3,183 units made up the rare GLi manual version. (Note: Disclaimer: Sales data taken from an archived official source. It does not specify whether the quantity sold apply to both export and domestic markets, or just the latter.)

Automotive Conversion Engineering (ACE), a subsidiary of Edaran Otomobil Nasional (EON) and a company which specializes in the development of limousines and TD2000 cars produced the Proton Perdana V6 Executive, an extended wheelbase variant offering an additional 25 cm (9.8 in) in the rear passenger compartment. A special edition of the Executive was also developed, featuring a specially designed "mobile office" themed console box, a 6.5 inch LCD TV and a VCD player. Additionally, two Proton Perdana V6 Limousine variants were released offering extended wheelbases of 66 and 91 cm (26 and 36 in) respectively over the original Perdana V6, and sported far more luxury equipment compared to the Executive variant.

The Proton Perdana V6 is widely used by the Malaysian government and to a lesser extent, the Royal Malaysia Police. Some foreign embassies in Malaysia also use the Perdana V6 as diplomat cars. Known foreign embassies, consulates or high commissions that have invested in the Malaysian-made Proton Perdana V6 include Palestine.

The Perdana was only sold in its domestic market and immediate neighbouring countries. However, a handful of Perdana and Perdana V6 units were exported to the United Kingdom to serve Proton's top British executives. The Perdana was also tested by Britain's Top Gear magazine in their April 1999 issue. In July 1999, there were plans to sell the Perdana V6 in Europe. However, such plans failed to materialize due to the 1997 Asian financial crisis and Proton's subsequent withdrawal from mainland Europe. Between 1998 and 1999, Proton also had intentions to market the Perdana with a 2.5-litre version of the V6 engine in Australia, but no such launch occurred.

On 12 April 2001, The Straits Times reported that Perdana V6s sold throughout Singapore were placed under a recall order due to problems with the steering and suspension system with the ball joints. Afterwards, no Proton Perdanas exist in Singapore, likely retired after the recall.

== Specifications ==
Specifications (Perdana V6)
Engine	2.0L 6A12
Format	V6 DOHC 24V
Total displacement (cc)	1,998
Bore x Stroke (mm)	78.4 x 69
Maximum Output [/rpm]	150 PS (110 kW; 148 bhp) / 6,750
Maximum Torque (Nm/rpm)	179 / 4,000
Maximum Speed	205 km/h (127 mph)
Acceleration 0–100 km/h (sec)	13.0
Fuel tank capacity (litres)	64
Chassis
Suspension (Front & Rear)	Multilink with Stabiliser bar
Brake (Front/Rear)	Ventilated disc 14" / Solid disc 14"

== Sales ==
Year	Malaysia (Note: Figures based on registration)
2000	11,442
2001	9,113
2002	6,812
2003	5,350
2004	5,841
2005	3,399
2006	2,248
2007	2,688
2008	1,750
2009	1,216
2010	655
2011	22
2012	2
