= Mitsubishi Diamante =

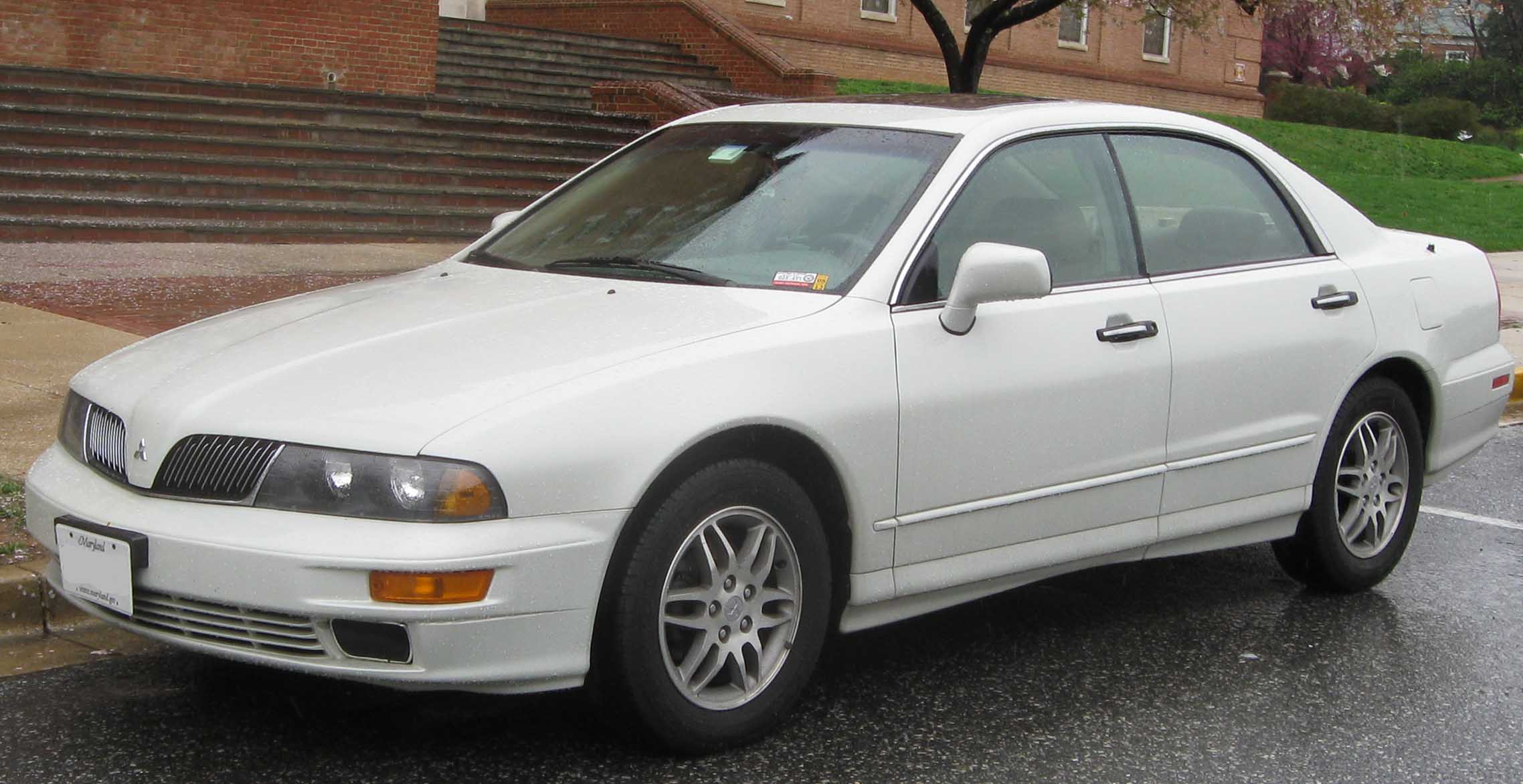

Overview
- Manufacturer: Mitsubishi Motors
- Also called: Mitsubishi Magna; Mitsubishi Sigma; Mitsubishi V3000; Mitsubishi Verada
- Production: 1990–2005
- Assembly: Japan: Nagoya; Australia: Adelaide, South Australia (Tonsley)

Body and chassis
- Class: Full-size

Chronology
- Predecessor: Mitsubishi Sigma
- Successor: Mitsubishi Galant (ninth generation)

The Mitsubishi Diamante is an automobile that was manufactured by Mitsubishi Motors from 1990 to 2005. The first series was a hardtop introduced to the public at the Tokyo Motor Show in 1989. It went on sale in Japan exclusively in May 1990 and won that year's Japan Car of the Year award. It was created by splicing an extra 6.6 cm (2.6 in) right down the middle of the Mitsubishi Galant, which itself had won the Japan Car of the Year award in 1987. The Diamante's platform was also used for the sporty Mitsubishi 3000GT.

The name Diamante was derived from the Spanish, Portuguese, and Italian word for "diamond" and was adopted also as homage to the Mitsubishi badge which is composed of three diamonds. In Japan, this vehicle was sold at the retail chain Car Plaza.

== History ==
From 1991, a more conventional Diamante-derived Mitsubishi Sigma sedan was also built in Japan for its domestic and European export markets. It became the basis of the second generation Magna independently built in Australia. Its Australian luxury derivate, sold as the Verada, became the Diamante for export markets including New Zealand and North America a year later. The Wagon version was also exported including to Japan.

There have been rumors that the Diamante was either not intended for a Japanese launch, or it might have been planned as a low-volume model. The reason for this argument is that until 1989, the width of vehicles impacted the taxation class. The Diamante, being wider than the 1,700 mm (66.9 in) breakpoint, would have suffered a large tax penalty against most of its rivals, which were designed to be just inside that vital limit. At the time, Mitsubishi's international image was also considered less than ideal for the marketing of a luxury car — its most expensive offering at the time, the Debonair, was largely seen as a company car project for Mitsubishi conglomerate executives. The Diamante's introduction was the result of the Honda/Acura Legend, which caught manufacturers by surprise when it appeared in 1986, inspiring the creation of the Lexus and Infiniti divisions, as well as various executive car class vehicles to be revised as a result. Mitsubishi needed to compete with the Legend and the Diamante was the result.

However, the tax situation changed in 1989, and the Diamante became the surprise hit of 1990. Amidst Japan's bubble economy, many private car owners sought an executive car in a market that had very few new offerings that year.

== First generation (1990–1995) ==
First generation
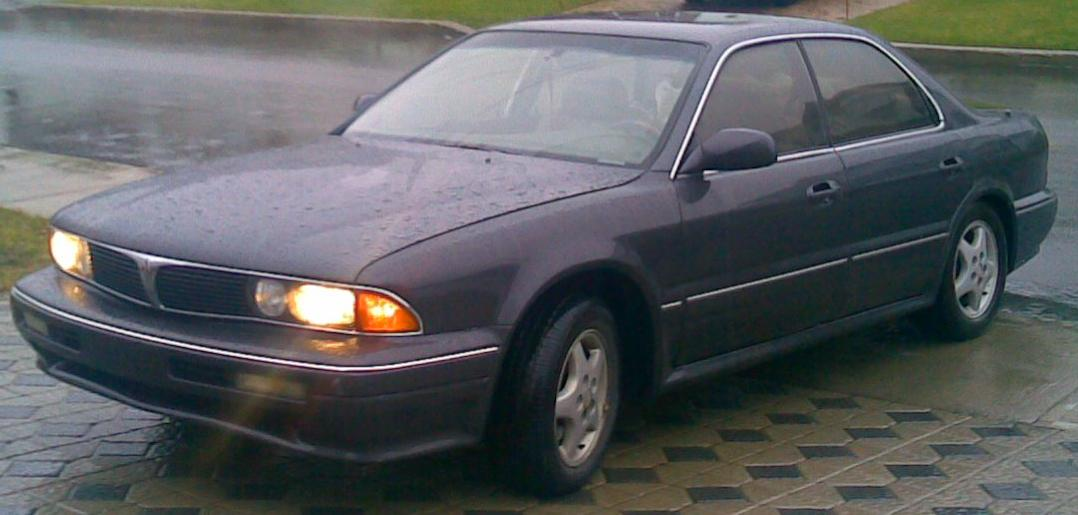

Overview
- Production: 1990–1996
- Model years: 1992–1996 (US)
- Designer: Shinichi Mitsuhashi

Body and chassis
- Body style: 4-door sedan (Sigma); 4-door hardtop sedan (Diamante); 5-door station wagon (Diamante and Sigma)
- Layout: Front engine, front-/Four-wheel drive
- Related: Mitsubishi 3000GT

Powertrain
- Engine: 1998 cc 6G71 V6 (F11A); 1998 cc 6A12 24V V6 (F12A); 2497 cc 6G73 24V V6 (F13/F15/F25); 2972 cc 6G72 V6 (F07); 2972 cc 6G72 24V V6 (F17/F27)
- Transmission: 4-speed automatic 5-speed manual

Dimensions
- Wheelbase: Sedan: 2,720 mm (107.1 in); Wagon: 2,723 mm (107.2 in)
- Length: Sedan: 4,830 mm (190.2 in); Wagon: 4,886 mm (192.4 in)
- Width: 1,775 mm (69.9 in)
- Height: Sedan: 1,335 mm (52.6 in); Wagon: 1,470 mm (57.9 in)

The first generation Diamante was produced in three versions:

- Four-side window hardtop: a four-door hardtop with frameless windows that was solely built in Nagoya, Japan, and only sold in Japan and North America. It featured advanced electronic aids such as four-wheel steering (4WS).
- Six-side window sedan: a more conventional variant built and introduced in Japan five months after the Diamante. It was called the Sigma and differed by having a slightly taller roofline, a six-window glasshouse, window sashes, revised front fascia and rear styling. It was exported to Europe from Japan and formed the basis of the second generation Magna/Verada sedan, which was independently built in Adelaide, South Australia. Its luxury derivative, the Verada was intended for the domestic consumption and primary export to North America (but export to North America never happened) (hence the longer bumper bars to meet the latter's more onerous crash standards).
- Wagon: this was the wagon version of the above-mentioned sedan, designed and manufactured exclusively by Mitsubishi Australia. It was introduced in late 1992 for the 1993 model year.

=== Japan ===
The Japanese Diamante hardtop was built from 1990 until 1995 and was available in front wheel drive (FWD) and all-wheel drive (AWD). Some models featured four-wheel steering (4WS). (Note: See Mitsubishi AWC for details.)

FWD versions featured an independent suspension design with MacPherson struts at the front and multi-link in the rear. This version was available with a range of engines listed below, some with five-speed manual in addition to four-speed automatic transmission. AWD Diamantes come in three models: the 25V 4WD, 30R 4WD and the flagship 30R-SE 4WD. All have MacPherson strut front suspension with double wishbones at the rear. Both front and rear brake discs are ventilated. The AWD Diamante sits 5 mm (0.2 in) lower than a standard FWD Diamante and has a 70-liter fuel tank instead of the FWD's 72-liter tank.

This range of vehicles was powered by three V6 engines (of 2.0-, 2.5- and 3.0-liter capacity) of the 6G7 family; AWD was available on most models. Perhaps contrary to its overseas image, Mitsubishi at the time fully emphasized the use of electronic gadgets in its cars and the Diamante is notable for a long list of such features. Each engine choice obligated buyers in Japan to pay more annual road tax and the level of standard and luxury equipment increased accordingly.

Chief among these was:

- The world's first autonomous cruise control system labelled Preview Distance Control;
- An electronically controlled active trace and traction control system that Mitsubishi developed and was the first integration of these two systems in the world. Simply labelled "TCL" in 1990, the system evolved into Mitsubishi's Active Skid and Traction Control (ASTC) system. Developed to help the driver maintain the intended line through a corner, an onboard computer monitored several vehicle operating parameters through various sensors. In essence, when too much throttle was applied while negotiating a curve, engine output and braking would be automatically regulated to ensure the proper line through the curve is followed and to provide the proper amount of traction under various road surface conditions. While conventional traction control systems at the time featured only a slip control function, Mitsubishi's newly developed TCL system had a preventive (active) safety function which improved the course tracing performance by automatically adjusting the traction force (called "trace control") thereby restraining the development of excessive lateral acceleration while turning. Although not a proper modern stability control system, trace control was able to monitor steering angle, throttle position and individual wheel speeds but without any yaw input. In addition, this TCL system also works together with Diamante's electronic controlled suspension and four-wheel steering that Mitsubishi developed to improve total handling and performance.

The Diamante won the Car of the Year Japan award in 1990–1991 and its model range was as follows:

20E

The 20E is the base model Diamante. It comes with a 2.0-liter 6G71 SOHC 12-valve V6 engine outputting 125 PS (92 kW) at 5500 rpm and 172 N⋅m (127 lb⋅ft) at 3500 rpm. It is available as both a five-speed manual and four-speed automatic, with 14-inch steel wheels. Standard equipment includes power windows, speed sensitive power steering, power mirrors, climate control and a four-speaker AM/FM radio with cassette. Optional extras were a rear wiper and alloy wheels. It has the F11A frame number. In October 1992 this engine was replaced by the new 24-valve 6A12 engine, with the same overall displacement but a shorter stroke. Power increased to 145 PS (107 kW) and the chassis number became F12A.

25E

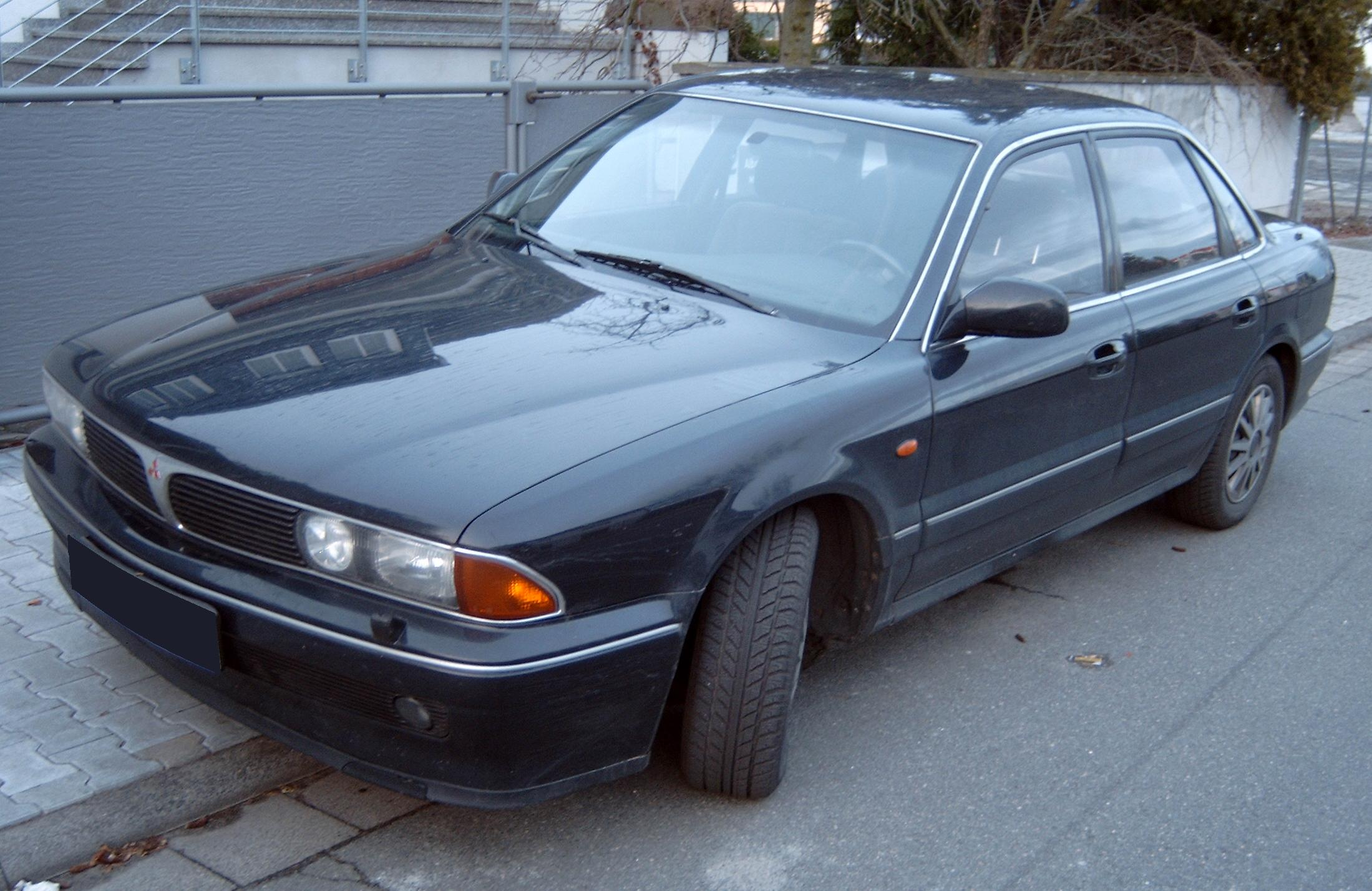

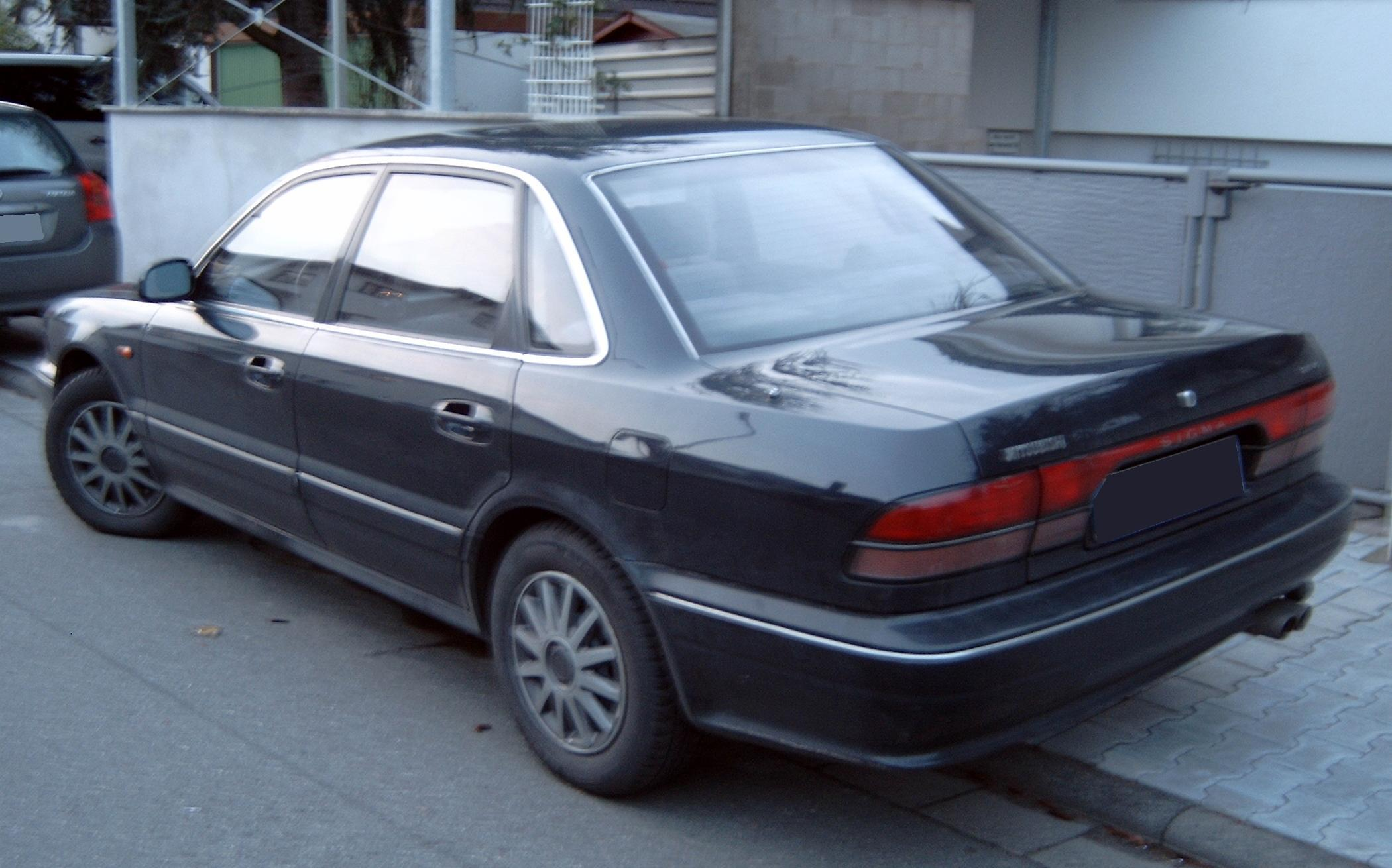
1991–1996 Mitsubishi Sigma sedan (Europe)

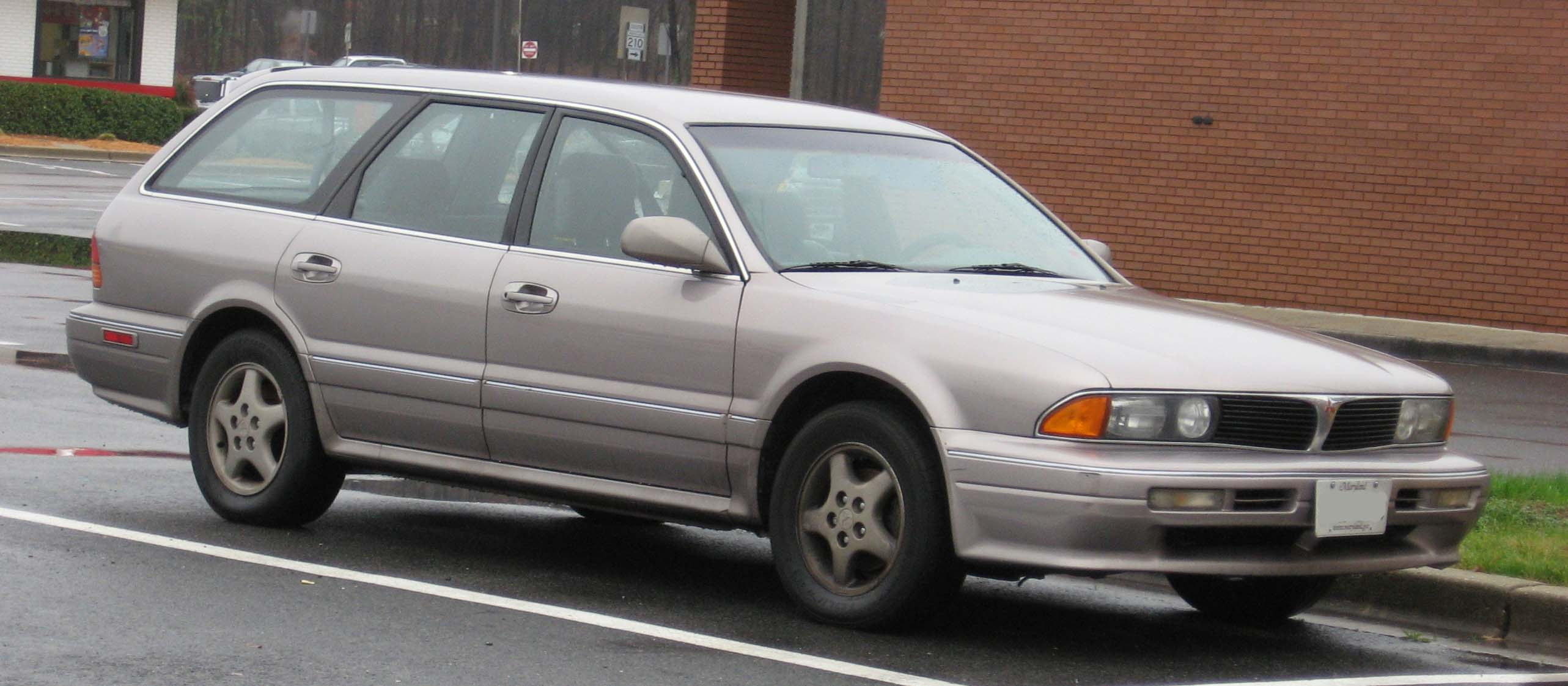

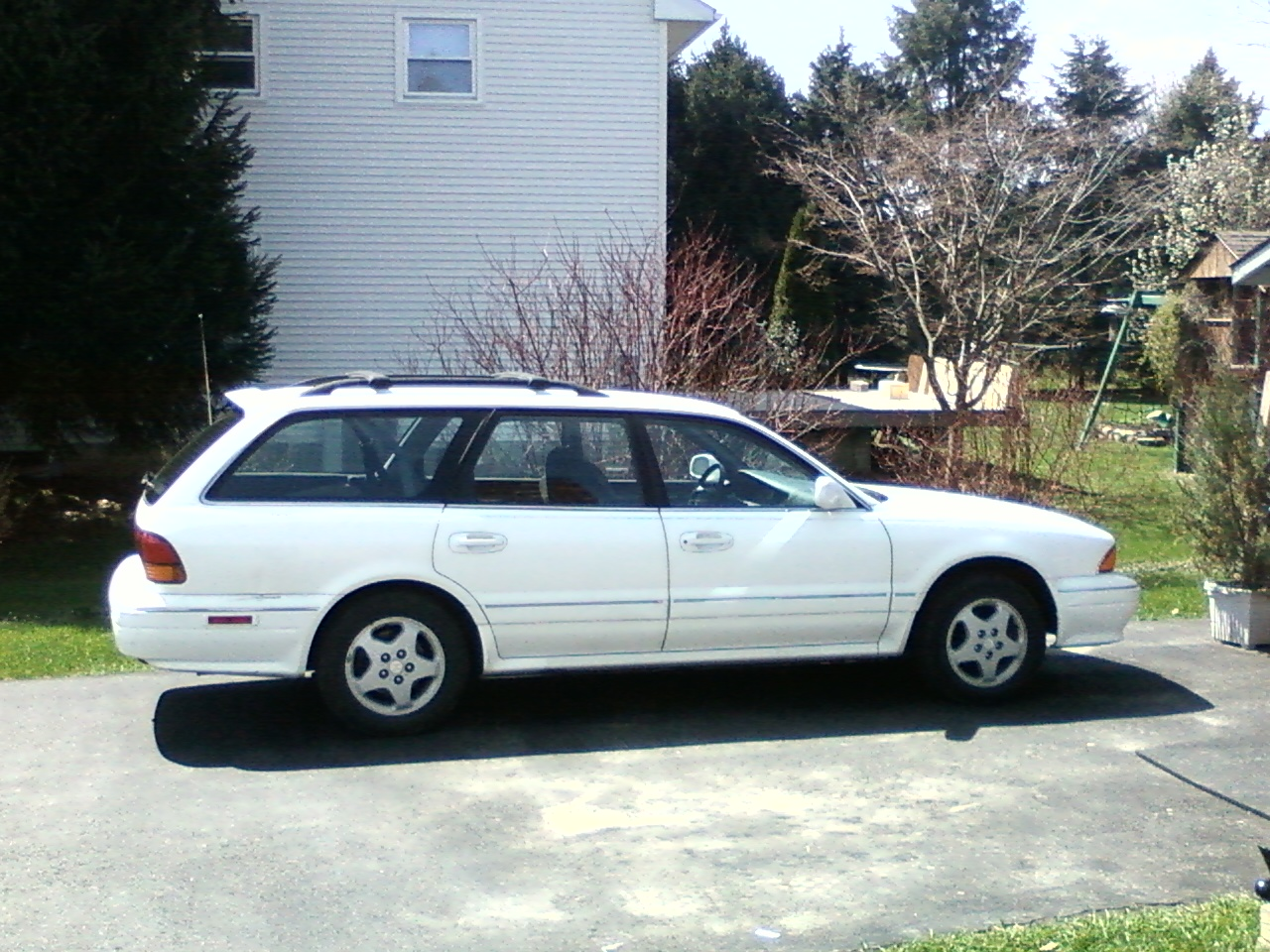
1993–1996 Mitsubishi Diamante LS station wagon (US)

The 25E has the same features as the 20E but replaces the 20E's 2.0-liter engine with a 2.5-liter unit. The 25E's 2.5-liter 6G73 V6 engine outputs 175 PS (129 kW) at 6000 rpm and 222 N⋅m (164 lb⋅ft) at 4500 rpm. The 25E has a frame number of E-F13A.

25V

The next model in the model range is the 25V. The 25V is almost the same as the 25E, although is identified with a different frame number reflecting the fact that four-wheel steering was equipped (E-F15A). It uses the same 2.5-liter 6G73 V6 engine, outputting 175 PS (129 kW) at 6000 rpm and 222 N⋅m (164 lb⋅ft) at 4500 rpm. It is available in four-speed automatic transmission and 15-inch alloy wheels. In addition to the 20E equipment, the 25V also features speed sensitive power steering, leather-wrapped steering wheel and ventilated rear brake discs for maximum braking performance. Optional was a rear wiper.

25V-SE

The 25V-SE is the top of the range 2.5-liter Diamante variant. As with its lower variants the 2.5-liter 6G73 V6 engine is used. Like the 25V upon which it is based, it is only available as an automatic. In addition to the 25V equipment, the 25V-SE features anti-lock braking system (ABS), traction control system (TCS) and electric-powered seats. Optionals are the rear wiper and leather interior. It is identified by the same E-F15A frame number as the 25V. There was also a version of this without the four-wheel steering called the 25V-S, with chassis code F13A.

30V

The 30V is the base 3.0-liter FWD Diamante base. It comes with a 3.0-liter 6G72 V6 outputting 210 PS (154 kW) at 6000 rpm and 270 N⋅m (199 lb⋅ft) at 3000 rpm. It is only available in automatic. The FWD Diamante Wagon comes with a 3.0-liter 6G72 V6 outputting 160 PS (118 kW) at 5000 rpm and 251 N⋅m (185 lb⋅ft) at 4000 rpm. On top of the 25V equipment, the 30V features cruise control, remote central locking, six-speaker AM/FM cassette player and TCS. Leather interior and rear wiper remain optional. The frame number of the 30V is E-F17A, F07W for the wagon (although it is sometimes referred to as "K45" as well).

30R

The 30R is the middle of the 3.0-liter FWD Diamante range. It uses the 3.0-liter 6G72 V6 outputting 210 PS (154 kW) a 6000 rpm and 270 N⋅m (199 lb⋅ft) at 3000 rpm. As with all higher spec Diamantes it is available in automatic only. The 30R, which sold for ¥40,000 more than the 30V has everything of the 30V except for TCS and ABS. The only addition is a front spoiler. The 30R is identified with the same E-F17A frame number.

30R-SE

The 30R-SE is the top of the FWD Diamante range. It uses the same 3.0-liter V6 as the 30R/30V and again is automatic only. The 30R-SE has all the equipment fitted to the 30V but active suspension granting it a 10 mm (0.4 in) road height. Externally, it also features the front spoiler of the 30R. Its frame number is E-F17A.

25V 4WD

The 25V 4WD is the entry level Diamante with AWD. It has a frame number of E-F25A.

The 25V comes with a 2.5-liter 6G73 V6 engine, outputting 175 PS (129 kW) at 6000 rpm and 222 N⋅m (164 lb⋅ft) at 4500 rpm. Standard equipment includes speed sensing power steering, power windows, power mirrors, cruise control, leather steering wheel, alloy wheels, remote central locking, climate control and a four speaker AM/FM radio with cassette player. Optional is full leather interior and a rear wiper.

30R-SE 4WD

The 30R-SE 4WD is the flagship of the Diamante range. It has the frame number of E-F27A as it is the same basic vehicle as the 30R. The only difference between the 30R-SE and 30R is the addition of a CD player.

=== North America ===
The Diamante sedan was first sold in the US in spring 1991 for the 1992 model year, replacing the Sigma. Mitsubishi Motors North America sourced their Diamante hardtop sedans from Japan and the wagons, introduced in late 1992 for the 1993 model year from Australia. The Diamante was originally available in two trim levels, the base and LS, and only as FWD automatics. The base model used the 6G72 3.0-liter V6 rated at 175 hp (130 kW), and shared with the Diamante wagon. The LS sedan got a dual-cam version of the 6G72, rated at 202 hp (151 kW). Standard equipment for ES included central locking, driver's airbag, power windows and power mirrors. Optional was ABS, cruise control, alloys and sunroof. The LS added alloy wheels, cruise control and ABS to the standard equipment list. A manual sunroof and leather were optional.

With the 1993 model year update, there were minor equipment changes, and the base Diamante gained the ES suffix. The station wagon also became available during 1993. When the Diamante was updated in 1994, sedans received revised taillamps, and a four-spoke steering wheel with audio controls. All models now included a passenger side airbag and cruise control as standard. For the LS, the manual sunroof was deleted from the option list and replaced with a CD player, power sunroof and traction control. Anti-lock brakes were standard on the LS and optional on the ES and wagon. For the 1995 model year, the ES sedan was relegated to fleet sales, leaving only the LS sedan and the station wagon available to the general public. For 1996, only the ES and LS sedan remained and were made available only to rental car companies.

=== Australia ===
The Australian-built first generation Diamante was manufactured in Adelaide, South Australia. It was marketed in its domestic market as the Verada, which was a more luxurious version of the more mainstream second generation Australian-made Magna, both based on the Japanese Sigma. This model was the only one also built as a wagon that, along with the sedan, was intended for both the Australian domestic and export markets.

=== Europe ===
In European markets, the Sigma was only available with the 3-liter, V6 engine. The 24-valve version produces 205 PS (151 kW), while the 12-valve V6 produces 177 PS (130 kW). In March 1993 the Australian-built Sigma Station Wagon this was the only option for the Sigma Station Wagon. The 12-valve engine in the sedan and 170 PS (125 kW) in the Australian-built wagon, introduced in March 1993. All versions were available with either a five-speed manual or a four-speed automatic (with different importers choosing whether or not to offer all iterations), but the manual options were discontinued in mid-1995. The station wagon had a simpler, more compact rear suspension to free up luggage space. However, the station wagon also had a lower maximum load than the sedan, at 555 kg (1,224 lb) including passengers, which somewhat limited its utility.

== Second generation (1995–2005) ==
Second generation
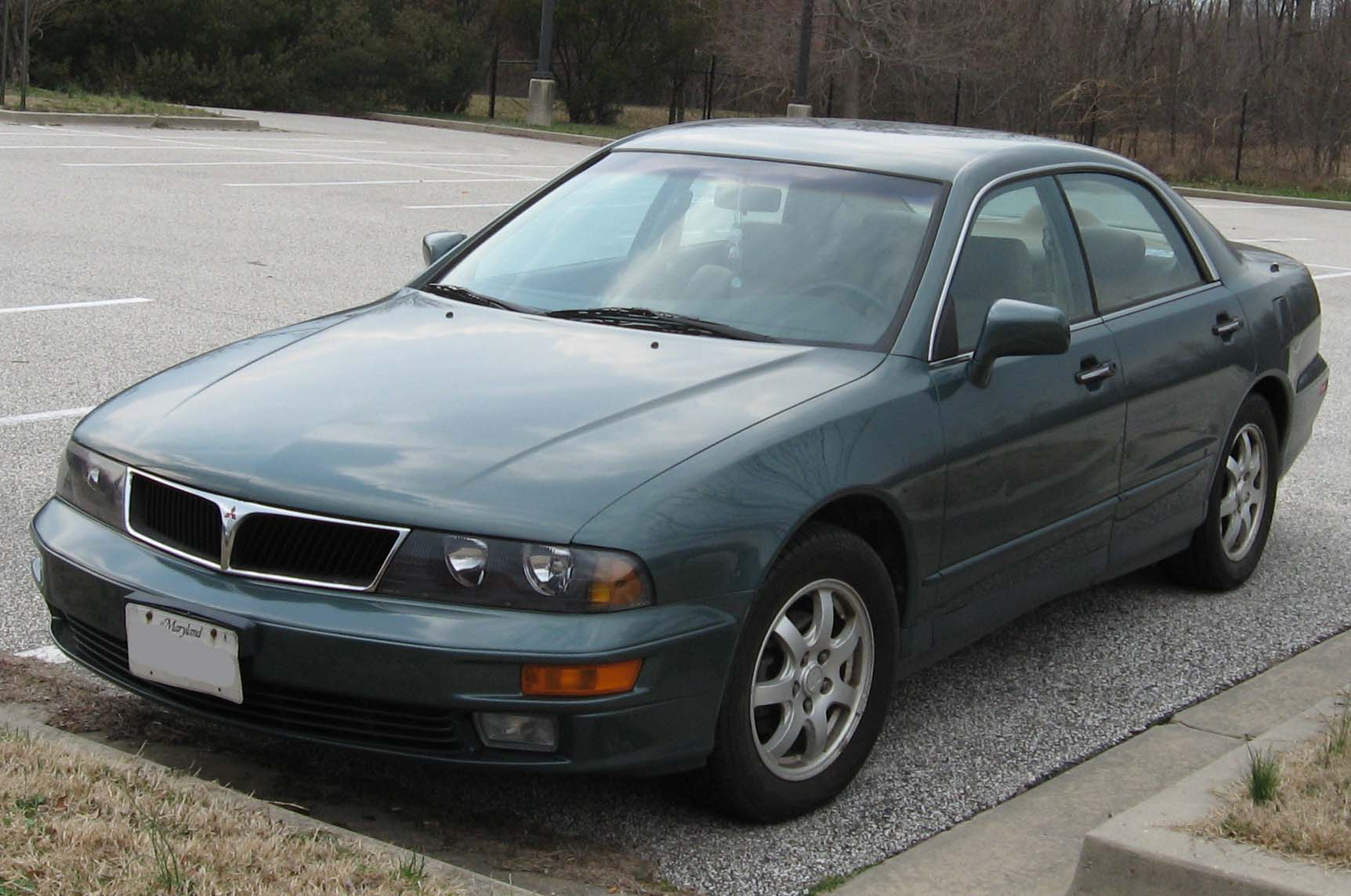

Overview
- Production: 1995–2005
- Model years: 1997–2004 (US); 2004 (Canada)
- Designer: Akinori Nakanishi

Body and chassis
- Body style: 4-door sedan 5-door station wagon
- Layout: FF layout

Powertrain
- Engine: 2.5 L 6A13 V6; 2.5 L 6G73 V6; 3.0 L 6G72 V6; 3.5 L 6G74 V6
- Transmission: 4-speed automatic 5-speed automatic

Dimensions
- Wheelbase: 2,720 mm (107.1 in)
- Length: 4,785–4,805 mm (188.4–189.2 in)
- Width: 1,785 mm (70.3 in)
- Height: 1,435 mm (56.5 in)

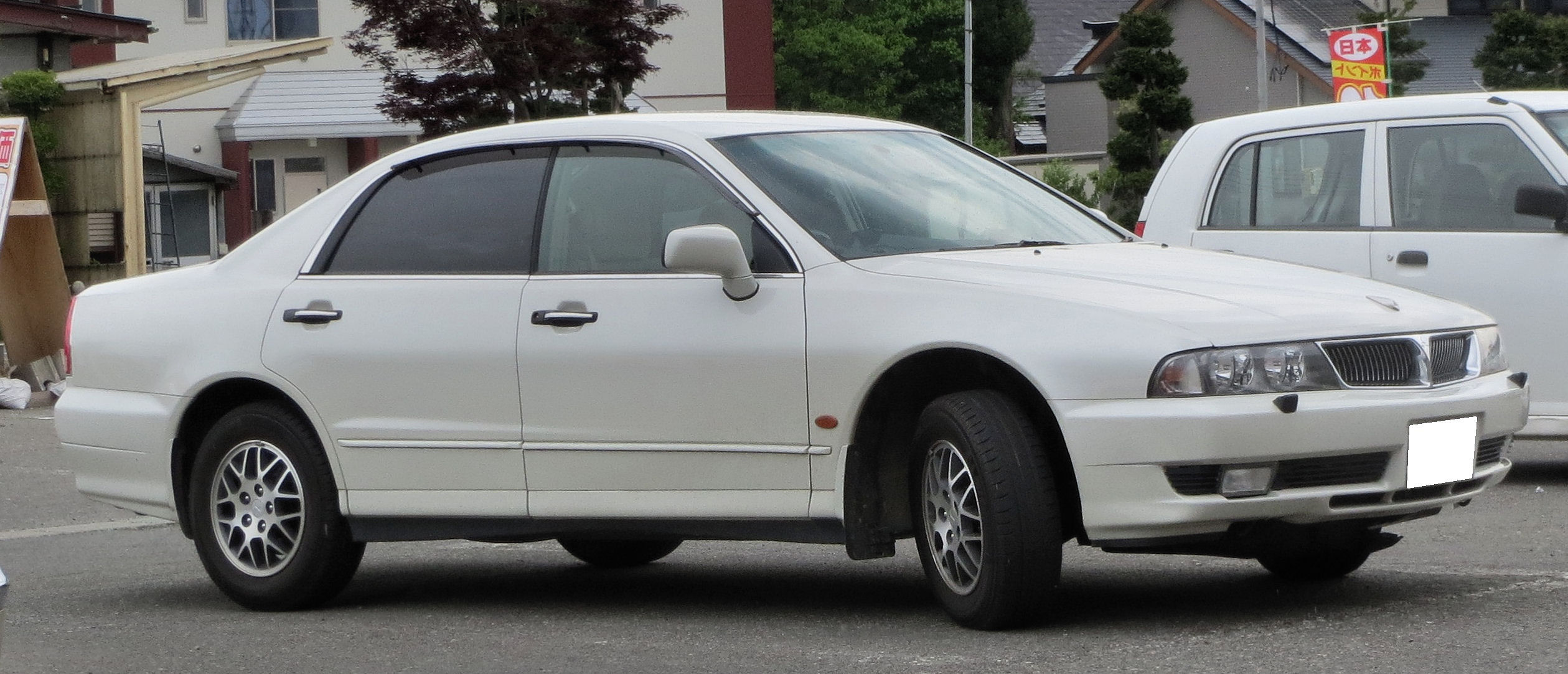
2002–2005 Mitsubishi Diamante 25V sedan (Japan)

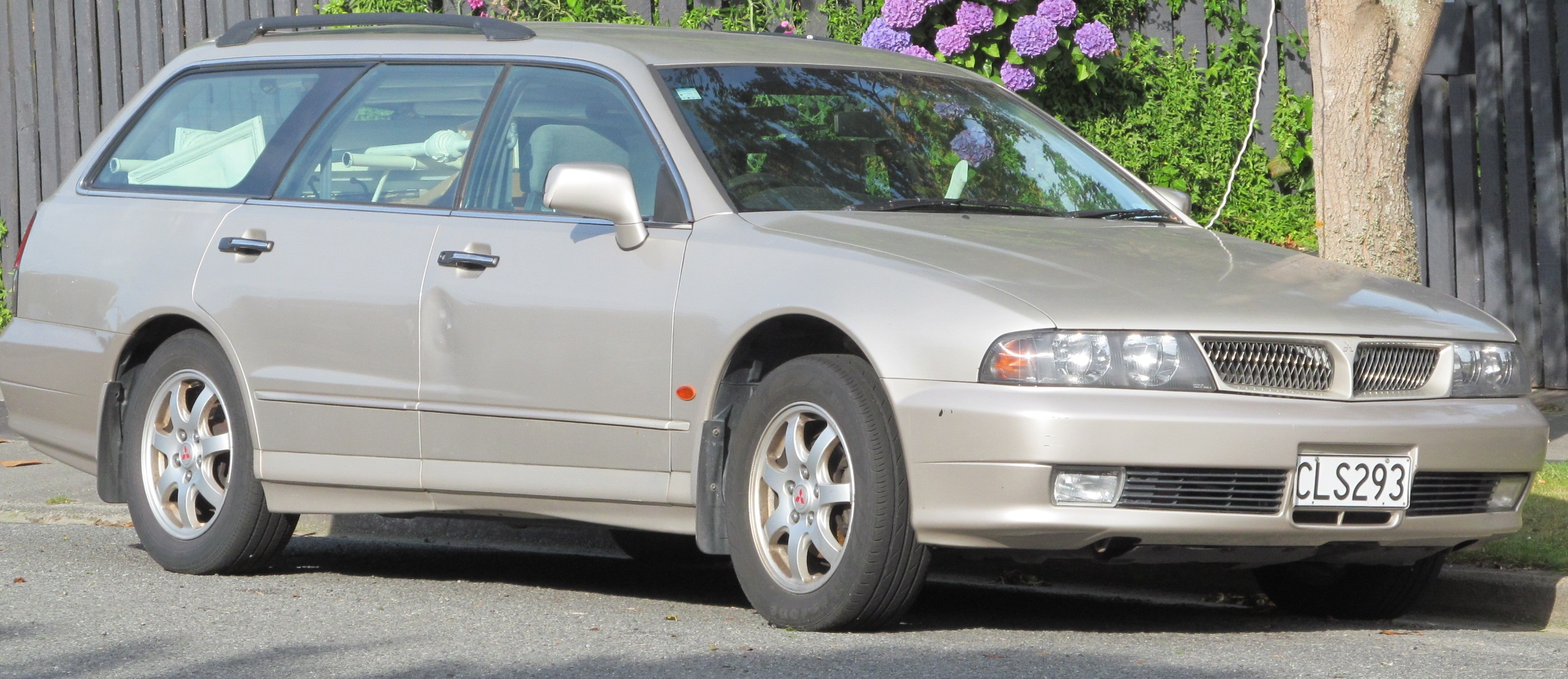
1998 Mitsubishi Diamante wagon

The second generation of the Diamante was introduced to the Japanese market in January 1995. The Sigma variant was eliminated and not renewed for a second generation, due to poor sales in Japan; after a strong start most Sigmas sold had become taxis and patrol cars.

The Diamante was marginally larger with improved headroom. It was powered by several engines: the base engine was a 2.5-liter MVV (lean burn) V6, followed by a number of 2.5 and 3.5-liter variants, the 2.5-liter engine sported 175 hp and the 3.5-liter engine boasted 210 hp (160 kW). The new Diamante range in Japan topped off with a 3.0-liter MIVEC V6 rated at 201 kW (270 hp) at 6000 rpm and 304 N⋅m (224 lb⋅ft) at 4500 rpm. In its latter years, the Diamante range was reduced to a single engine offering in Japan, first a 3.0-liter GDI V6 with 240 hp (180 kW) (the first of its kind), and then a conventional 2.5-liter V6.

The Australian produced Verada came off the production line on 1 July 1996, and now formed the basis of all Diamantes sold outside Japan. Both the Verada (designated the KE series in Australia) and the Magna (TE series) on which it was based, won the 1996 Wheels' Car of the Year award.

Sales on the US market commenced with the 1997 model year in late October 1996, where it occupied "near luxury" segment and competed on price with vehicles like the Lexus ES 300. The Diamante featuring export-only extra equipment such as keyless entry, but never featuring the eventual all wheel drive (AWD) drivetrain that became available for the Australian and New Zealand range (respectively badged Verada and Diamante). The North American Diamante also didn't receive an automatic with a manual-shift mode until 2004, and even then it was available only in LS and VR-X models and had only four speeds.

These Australian export models were mechanically different from the Japanese Diamante since the latter:

- had multi-link front and rear suspension (whereas the Australian version had more basic MacPherson front struts);
- only featured leather trim (Verada Ei featured cloth trim);
- had a foot-operated parking brake (whereas the Australian production featured a conventional lever design)
- had a pressed steel front cross-member.

In addition, with the Japanese Diamante, Mitsubishi introduced more technological innovations including:

- a more advanced Traction control system (which was later introduced in Australia and therefore all export models);
- satellite navigation system with a display featuring prominently on the center console;
- Head-Up Display;
- a distance/lane-keeping system that tracked lanes and cars ahead using a set of laser and camera (being technology first adopted by the 1992 Debonair);
- the world's first five-speed automatic transmission in a transverse-engined drivetrain, complete with INVECS-II software logic and Tiptronic-functionality (the latter also subsequently introduced on Australian models from the KJ-series).

Australia was also the source of all Diamante wagons, for its domestic market and export markets including Japan, where their sales commenced in October 1997.

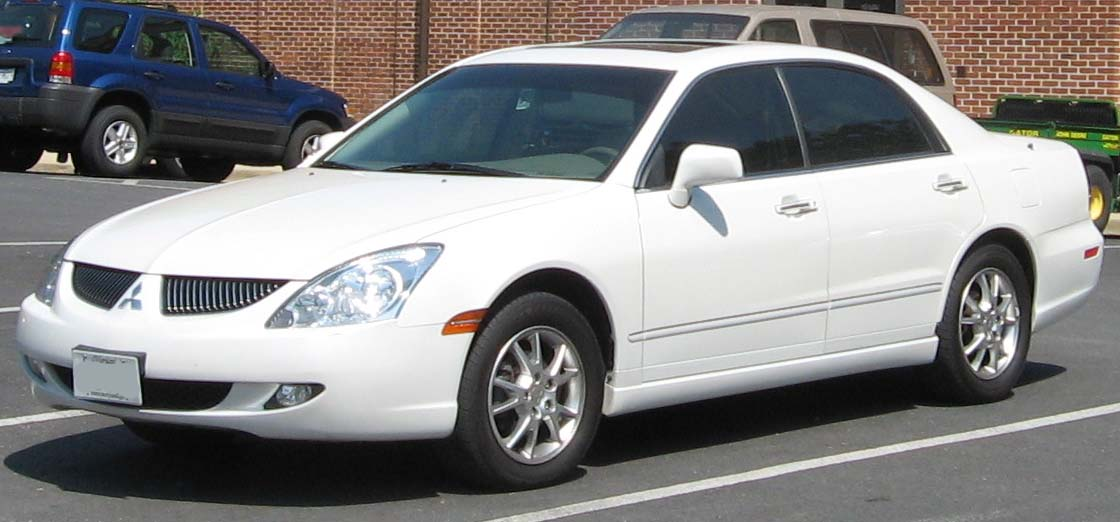
2004 Mitsubishi Diamante sedan (U.S.)

The exterior was refreshed for 2002 at which time, the Diamante won New Zealand's Car of the Year award. A radical restyle followed with the presentation at the 2003 New York International Auto Show of a new Diamante adopting the then new corporate look. Mitsubishi ceased to export the Diamante to North America after 2004 due to a decline in sales and unfavourable exchange rates. The U.S. market Galant grew in size, and the Diamante was replaced by the upper-end GTS trim of the Galant.

In Canada, the Diamante was only sold from December 2003 for the 2004 model year only. The Canadian version is based on the US version, but with some subtle changes such as daytime running headlamps, heated exterior mirrors, English/French labelling, and metric gauges/trip computer.

In Japan, the Diamante did not receive the extensive 2002 and 2004 restylings of the US and Australian/New Zealand models. It continued in its original narrow-body 1995 form until 2005. On 15 June 2005, Mitsubishi announced it would halt production on larger sedans within Japan by December of that year, affecting both Diamante and Galant models. The production of the Magna/Verada combo by Mitsubishi Motors Australia continued unaffected.

=== VR-X ===
Introduced in 2002, the VR-X was a sporty variant of the Australian-made Diamante exported to North America. It was continued with the 2004 restyling.

The 2002 model's exterior was based on the top-of-the-range Australian KJ-series Verada sedan, whereas its mechanicals and fittings were derived from a combination of other Australian-made models:

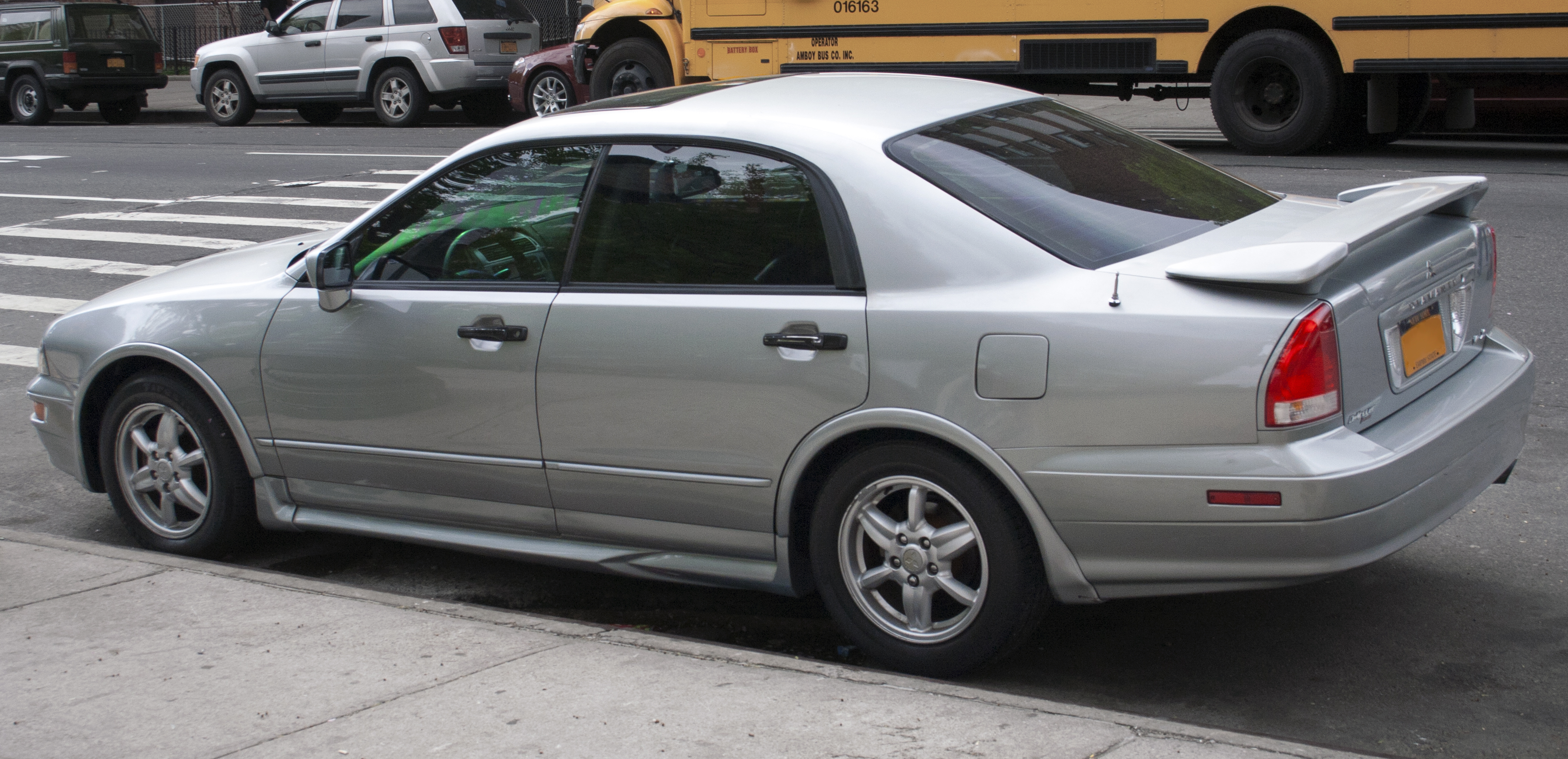
2003 Diamante VR-X sedan (U.S.)

- Stiffer sports suspension from the limited edition Verada GTV (which, in turn, inherited it from the Magna Sports/VR-X sedans);
- 16-inch sports alloy wheels from the Magna Sports;
- Leather trim and electric seats from the Verada Xi;
- White "VR-X"-marked instrument fascia from the Magna VR-X (as opposed to the standard Diamante and Verada electro instruments);
- Silver centre console trim and 2-tone leather steering wheel from the Magna VR-X Limited Edition (losing the other Diamante's radio remote control);
- Bodykit featuring front wheel arch extensions and wheelbase skirts from the Magna VR-X, plus unique rear wheel arch extensions and bootlid spoiler.

Unique to the American VR-X was a 270-watt, eight-speaker sound system and its engine was a 3.5-liter V6 engine that developed 210 hp (157 kW) compared to the standard Diamante's 3.5-liter V6 engine's 205 hp (153 kW). This VR-X did not, therefore, feature the Australian "high output" version fitted to the Magna Sports/VR-X based Verada GTV, whose engines produced 163 kW (219 hp) and were mated to an advanced five-speed tiptronic automatic transmission (or also a five-speed manual in the case of the said Magna models).

The 2004 model continued the above mix of features but this time became more directly based on the TL-series Magna. Specifically, unlike the standard Diamante models that were Verada on the outside, the 2004 model was based on the Magna VR-X (for example, the rear light cluster were identical between these two). This Diamante VR-X inherited the 16-inch alloy wheels from the Australian Magna VR-X AWD (notably, the front-wheel drive Magna instead had 17-inch alloy wheels and the Magna Sports was no longer the wheel donor car because it was discontinued by this time). Electric seats and leather trim remained Verada-derived fittings. The steering wheel remained the 2-tone leather unit of the 2001 TJ series Magna VR-X Limited Edition (that became an optional accessory available across the Australian range).

== Sales ==
Year	U.S. sales
1993	25,267
1994	18,096
