= Proton Waja =

Saloon car

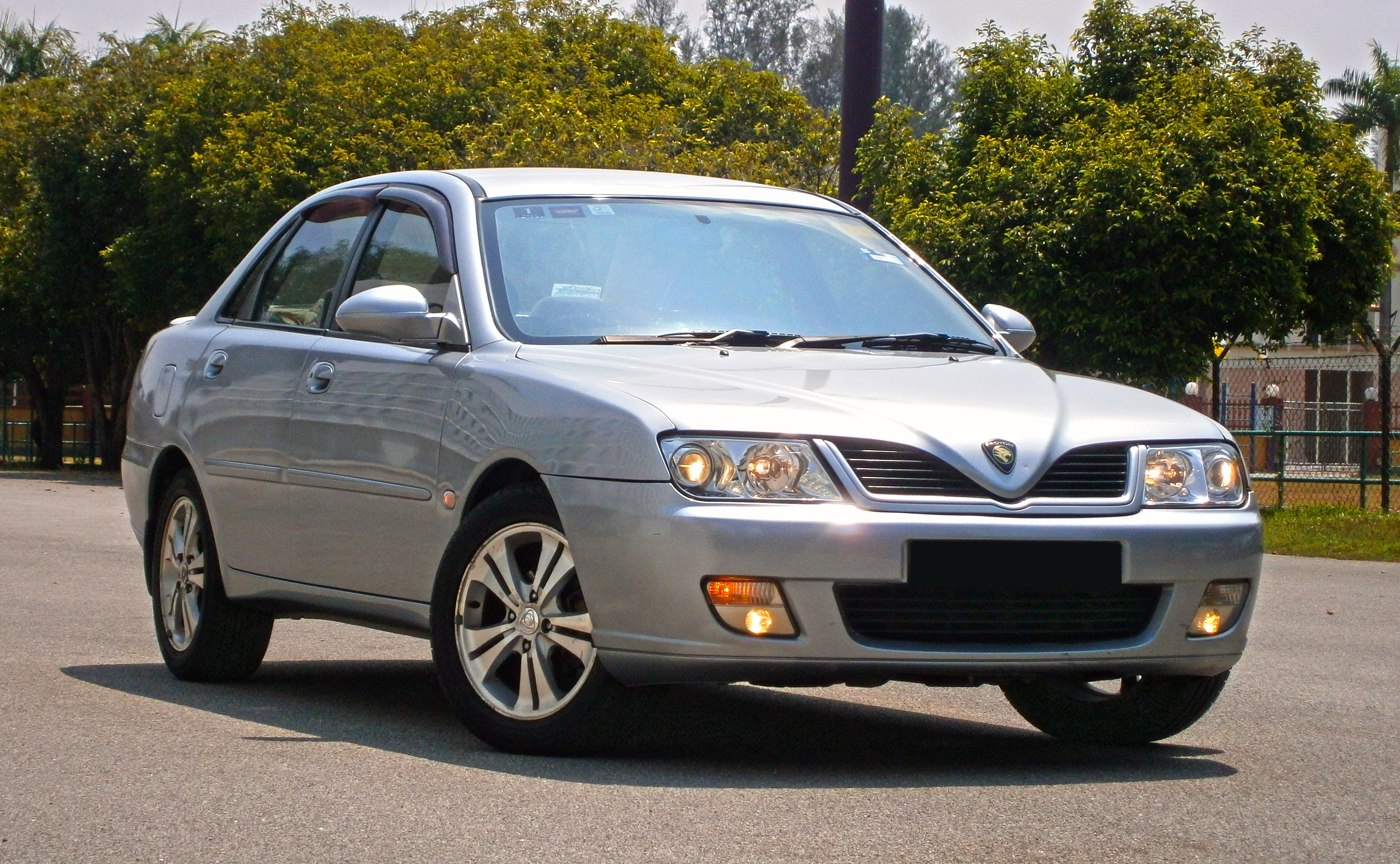

Overview
- Manufacturer: Proton
- Also called: Proton Impian (United Kingdom, Iran, Pakistan)
- Production: May 2000 – June 2011
- Assembly: Malaysia: Shah Alam, Selangor (PONSB)

Body and chassis
- Class: Compact / C-segment
- Body style: 4-door saloon
- Layout: Front-engine, front-wheel drive
- Platform: Proton GX
- Related: Mitsubishi Carisma / Volvo S40; Proton GEN•2 / Persona

Powertrain
- Engine: 1.6 L 4G18 SOHC I4; 1.6 L CamPro S4PH DOHC I4; 1.6 L CamPro CPS DOHC I4; 1.8 L F4P DOHC I4; 2.0 L E01 DOHC I4 (F1 safety car version); 2.0 L 6A12 DOHC V6 (Chancellor only)
- Transmission: 5-speed manual 4-speed automatic

Dimensions
- Wheelbase: 2,600 mm (102.4 in)
- Length: 4,470 mm (176.0 in)
- Width: 1,740 mm (68.5 in)
- Height: 1,420 mm (55.9 in)
- Kerb weight: 1,215–1,235 kg (2,679–2,723 lb)

Chronology
- Successor: Proton Inspira

The Proton Waja is a saloon car manufactured by Malaysian automotive company, Proton, it was launched in May 2000 by fourth Prime Minister Mahathir Mohamad.

The name Waja, which means (strong as) steel in Malay has both physical and abstract connotations. In the United Kingdom, it was sold as the Proton Impian, in which Impian was another derivative of the Malay language, meaning dream.

The Proton Waja was heralded as the first indigenously-designed Malaysian car upon its debut. However, it was later revealed that the Waja's chassis is a modified adaptation of the Mitsubishi Carisma / Volvo S40 platform. Furthermore, early Waja models were powered by Mitsubishi and Renault engines, as the development of Proton's own Campro engine did not complete in time for the Waja's launch frame.

Over 292,556 Proton Wajas were sold between 2000 and 2012. Waja variants powered by the 1.6 litre Mitsubishi 4G18 engine made up for the bulk of total sales, followed by the 1.6 litre Proton CamPro S4PH / CPS and lastly, the 1.8 litre Renault F4P. (Note: Disclaimer: Sales data taken from an archived official source. It does not specify whether the quantity sold apply to both export and domestic markets, or just the latter. However, quantity sold between 2007 and mid-2012 only apply to the domestic market.)

== History ==
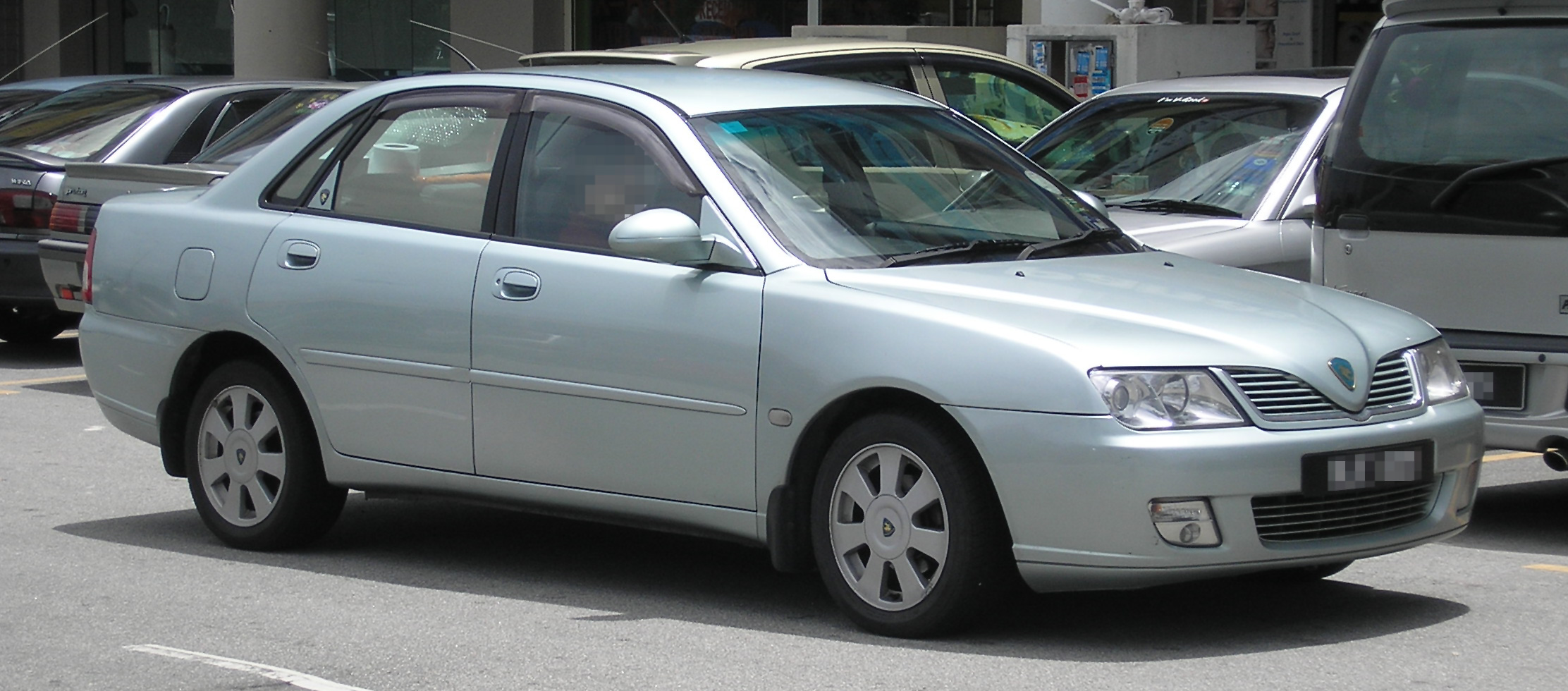

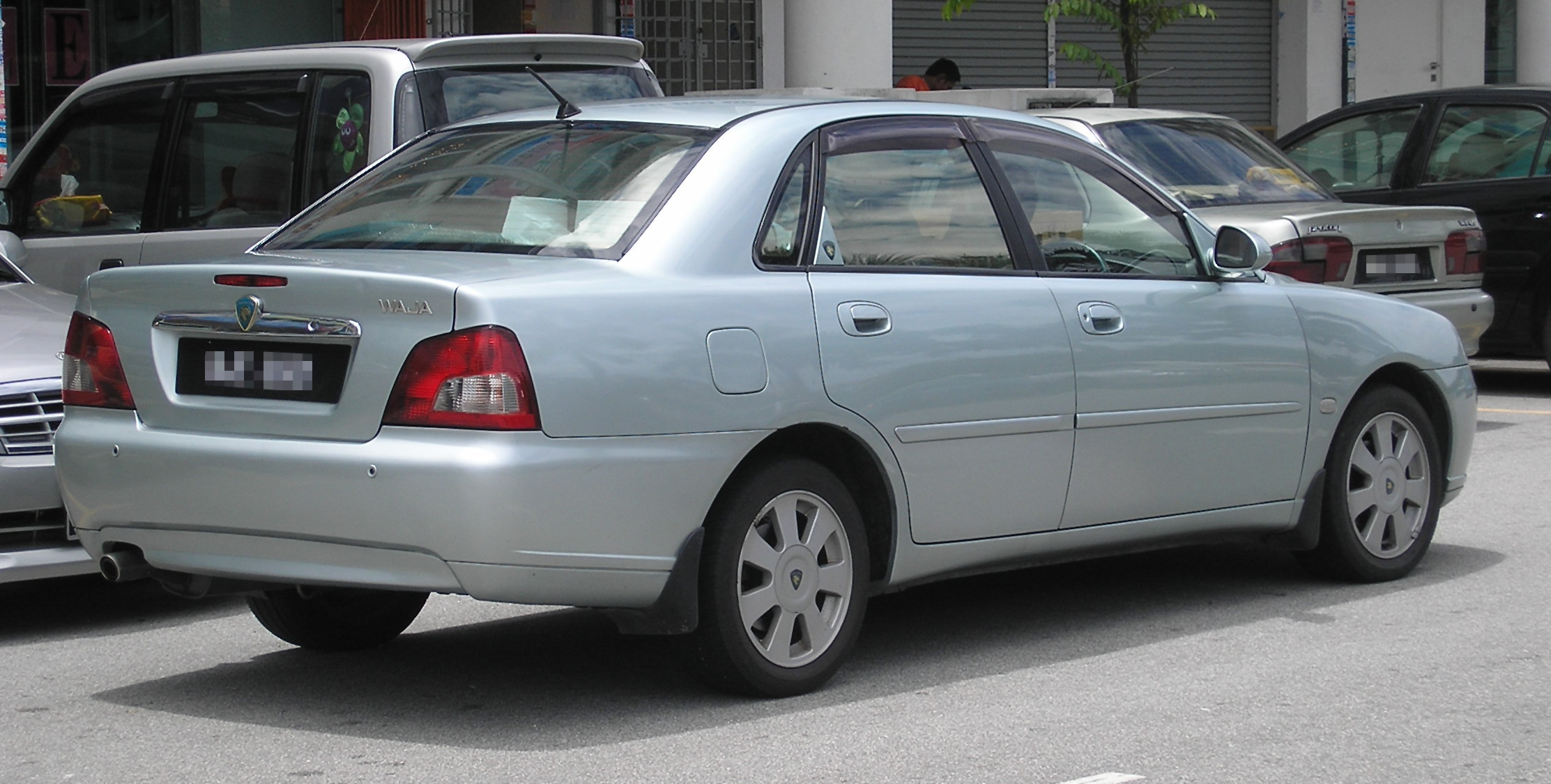
Pre-facelift Proton Waja

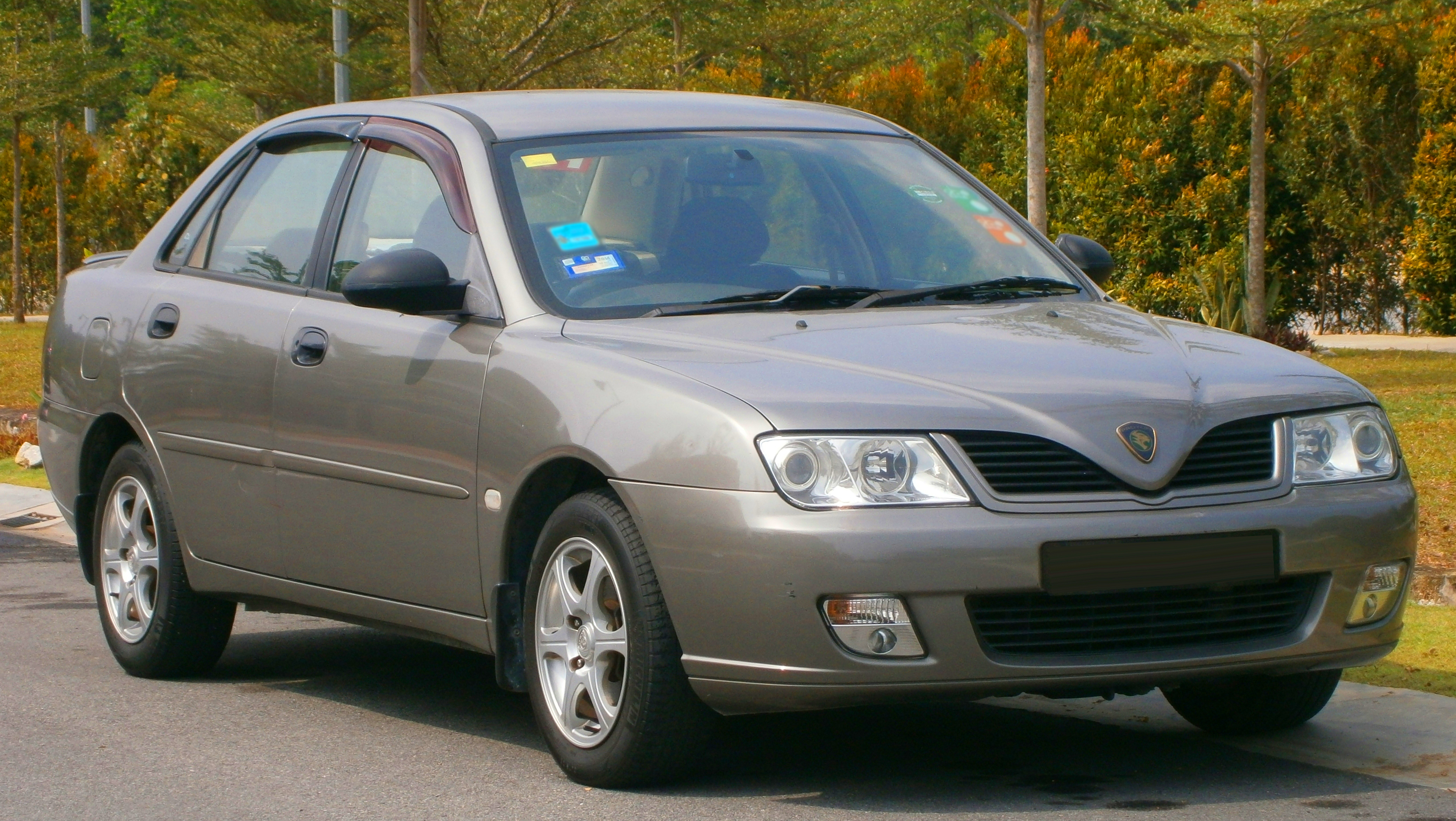

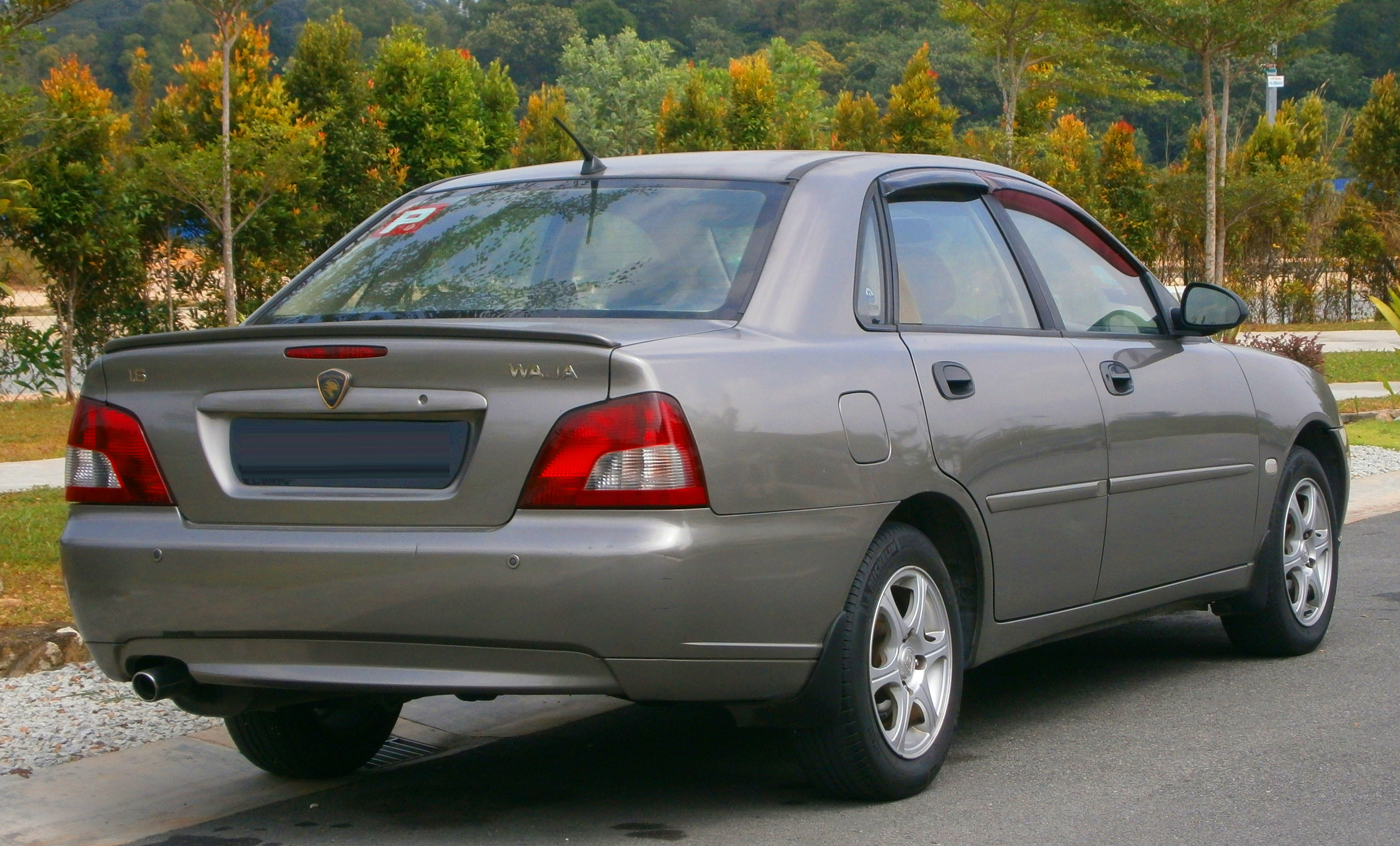
First facelift Proton Waja 1.6

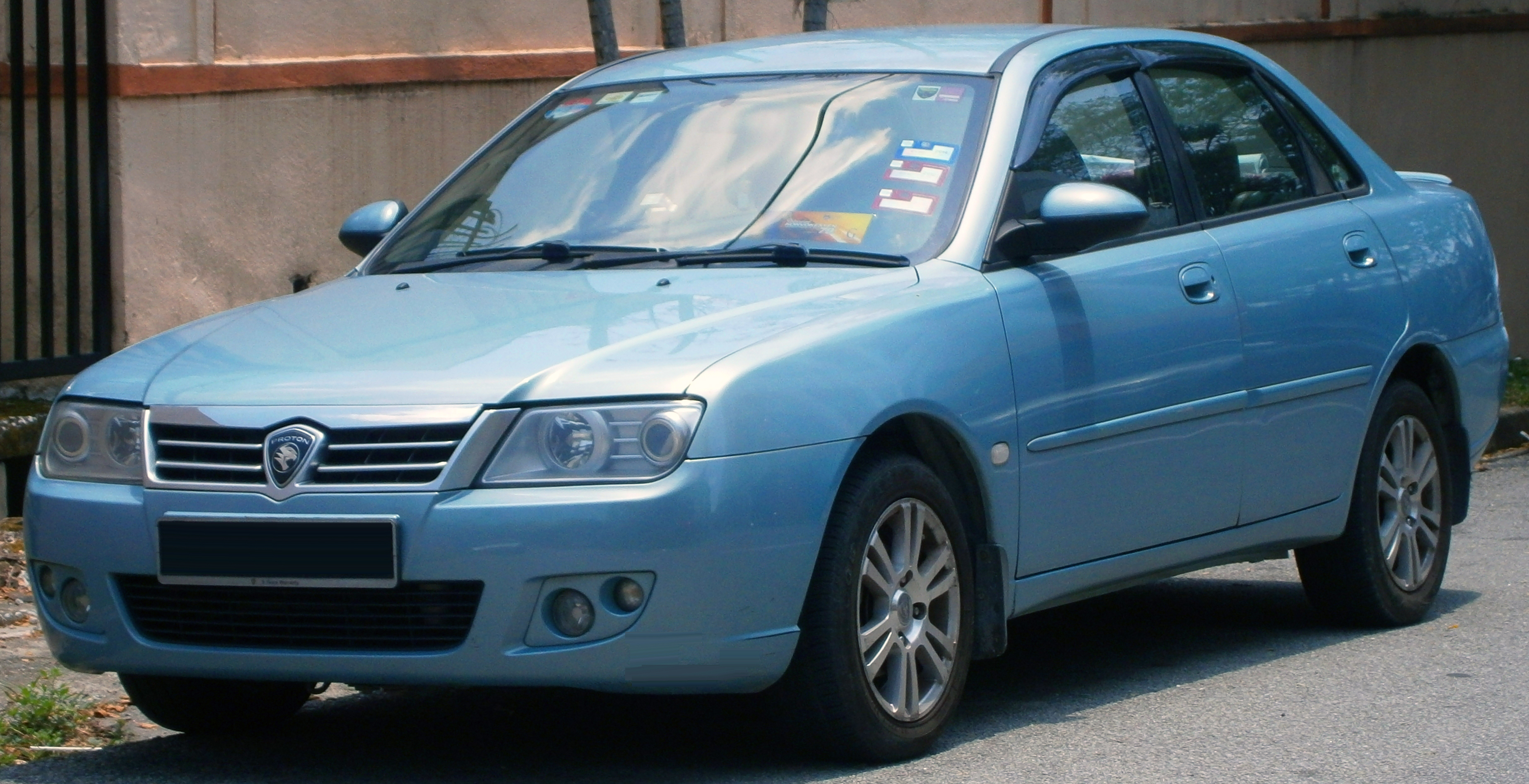

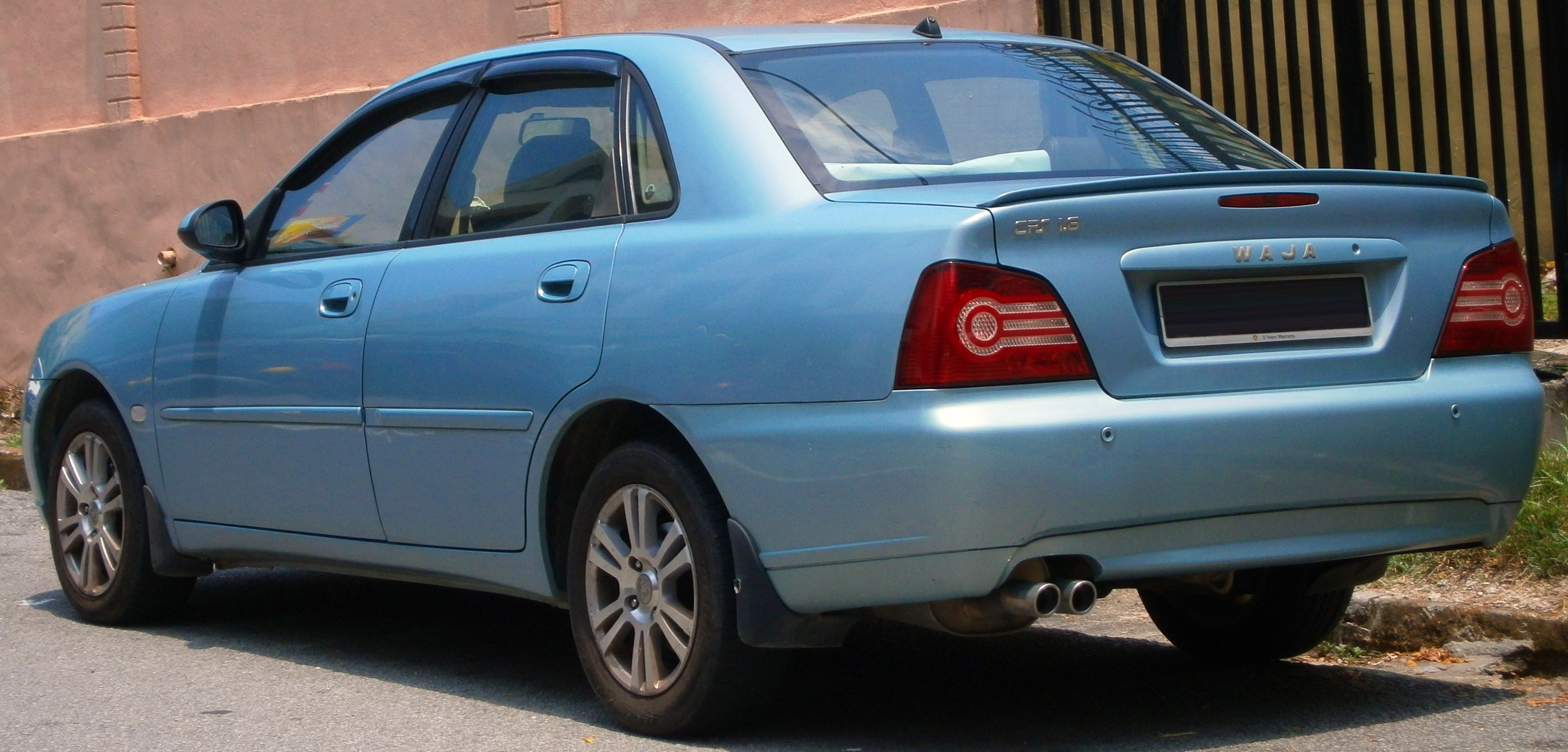
Second facelift Proton Waja 1.6 Premium

The Proton Waja was launched on 8 May 2000, together with the introduction of Proton's new corporate logo. Early batches of the Waja had no airbags, ABS, and came with fabric seats only.

On Saturday, 6 October 2001, the Proton Waja 1.6X was launched. It was only available with an automatic transmission and was equipped with more luxurious items like a semi automatic air conditioning system, ABS with Brake Assist (BA) and Electronic Brake Force Distribution (EBD), auto flip mirror, a semi wood steering wheel, wood grain interior, full leather seats and door trim. The audio system was upgraded to a Clarion PX1676AA, with a built in CD player and six disc CD changer.

Proton made minor changes to the seats by adding rear armrest with cup holder (which the standard Waja lacked), rear seats adjustable head rest and lumbar support for driver seats. Safety features were also added such as a driver's airbag and ABS.

In 2002, Proton launched the Proton Waja 1.8X. It was powered by the Renault F4P engine, which was also found in the Renault Laguna. Its equipment was mostly shared with the Proton Waja 1.6X. However changes included a passenger airbag and larger front discs brakes.

In conjunction with the 20th anniversary since the launch of the Proton Saga in 1985, a limited edition Waja called the Proton Waja 20th Anniversary was launched sometime in 2005. Also known as P20Y or Proton's 20 year, this limited edition was powered by the Mitsubishi 4G18 engine and featured leather seats with 20th anniversary logo embossed. The front grille got a U-shaped chrome surround and wheels identical to that later used with CPS powered Waja's.

At the end of 2005, Proton additionally introduced another variant of the Waja, known as Proton Chancellor. It was used by representatives of the Association of Southeast Asian Nations (ASEAN) during the meeting of ASEAN leaders in the KLCC, shortly before its launch in 2006. The Chancellor had a longer wheelbase and a 2.0 litre Mitsubishi 6A12 V6 engine, similar to that used in Proton Perdana V6. The car was only available with a four speed automatic transmission.

In January 2006, the Proton Waja was updated. The major change was the Campro S4PH engine. Other changes included leather seats, a beige and brown interior color, a new meter cluster, redesigned air-condition vents and a new double-DIN CD player with MP3 support. These models also have a new rims which it has been stop using on the facelift version and used back in the CPS models. Models with Campro engine were more expensive though sold alongside the Mitsubishi 4G18 equipped Waja initially.

In June 2006, the Proton Waja exterior was updated with a new honeycomb lower grille, new headlamps, new rear taillights nicknamed thermometer taillights, the Waja lettering moving to above the number plate and new alloy wheels.

Proton's motorsports division, Race Rally Research (R3) launched the commemorative special edition duo of the Proton Waja MME Edition and Proton GEN.2 MME Edition in August 2006. They were built to celebrate Protons R3 Amprex team emerging victorious as Overall champions and Class O champions completing 279 laps in a specially-built Lotus Exige 300RR. Only 200 units of each car available, and each car will have a serial number and name plate due to its limited edition run. MME stood for Merdeka Millenium Endurance edition.

Details changes includes:

1. Available only in Deep Burgundy Colour and Manual Transmission
2. R3 five piece Zerokit Bodykit (Wau Bumper Design)
3. R3 Dark Titanium Xenon HID Headlamps
4. R3 Cat-Back Performance Exhaust System for the Campro engine with a stylish oval tip
5. R3 Performance Spark Plug Cables
6. R3 Zerokit seven spoke wheels 16 inch size with emblem
7. R3 Performance Slotted Rear Brake Discs
8. R3 Performance Spring Kit
9. R3 Aluminium Front strut bar
10. R3 Red Alloy CamPro engine cover
11. R3 Red MME gearknob
12. R3 Floor mats
13. R3 12 MME Sticker on each side fender
14. Headunit with Bluetooth and iPod support with iPod Nano 1GB with R3 ensign.

In 2007, the Proton Waja was facelifted with new headlamp, new fog lamp, new hood and garnish, new bumper, new grille and new front turn signal lamp. Two variants were available: 1.6M/T and 1.6A/T with five color options: Twilight Blue, Iridescent White, Burgundy, Metal Grey and Brilliant Red.

In 2008, the Waja received the 125 PS (92 kW) CamPro CPS engine. The exterior was given minor changes, such as a new grille and new tail lights and the rims from the original Campro version Waja. The 2008 Waja CPS also includes both ABS and airbag as standard for the Malaysian market, which were previously optional equipment.

Throughout the 11 year production, many enhancements, revision to equipment and running changes took place.

== British Touring Car Championship ==
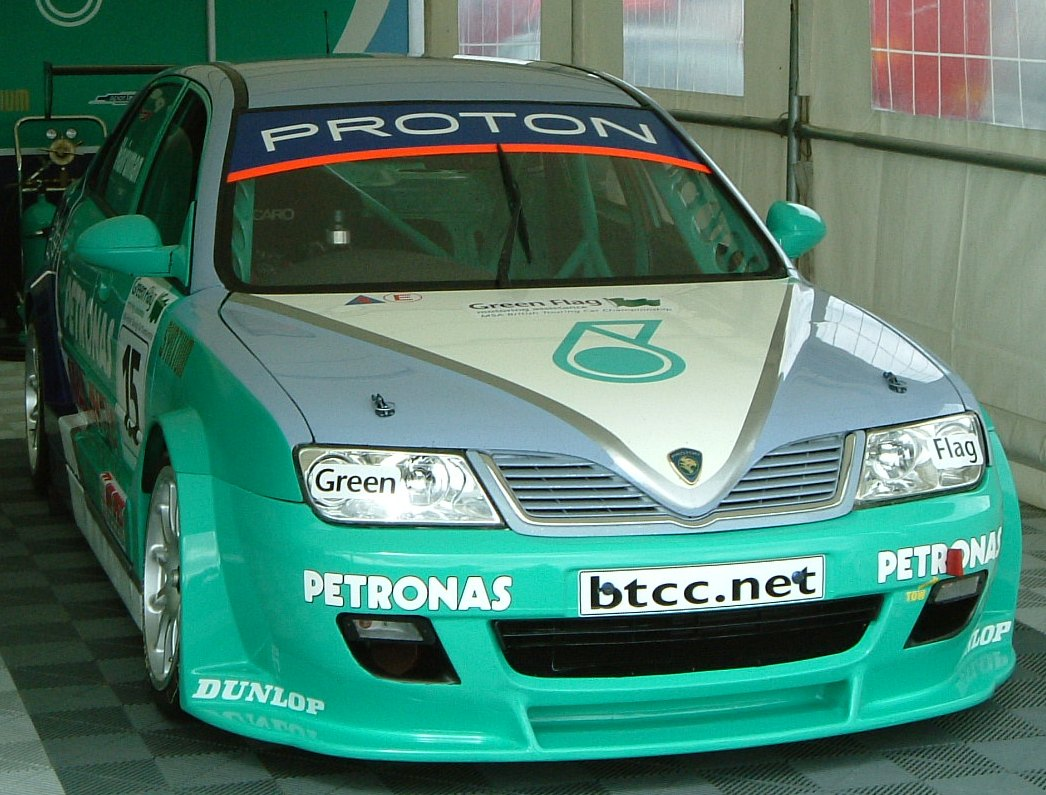
Team PSP's BTC-T Proton Impian at Knockhill Circuit, Scotland.

The British Touring Car Championship (BTCC) is a touring car racing series held each year in the United Kingdom. Proton formerly participated in the BTCC between 2002 and 2004 under the official team name, Petronas Syntium Proton (Team PSP). The team in the 2002 and 2003 BTCC seasons was headed by Scottish and English drivers David Leslie and Phil Bennett respectively in two heavily modified BTC-T Proton Impian touring cars.

Both drivers were succeeded by South African Shaun Watson-Smith and Malaysian Fariqe Hairuman in the 2004 season. Team PSP proved largely unsuccessful in the BTCC, with just two wins out of a grand total of 95 races, and finally withdrew altogether after the conclusion of the season of 2004.

== Export ==
=== Australia ===
The Waja made its international debut in Australia in November 2000 during the 2000 Sydney Motor Show. There, it was called simply as the Proton GX and was announced to be on sale in the second quarter of 2001 with a 1.8-litre engine. The Waja finally went on sale a year in Australia as the Waja powered by the Mitsubishi 4G18 engine. Two variants were offered: 1.6 and 1.6X with the latter being more equipped than the former variant. Critics praised its handling characteristics and standard equipment list, but lamented its underpowered engine and build quality. Sales projections were for 1000-1500 per year, but just 441 Wajas were sold in Australia in total.

=== United Kingdom ===
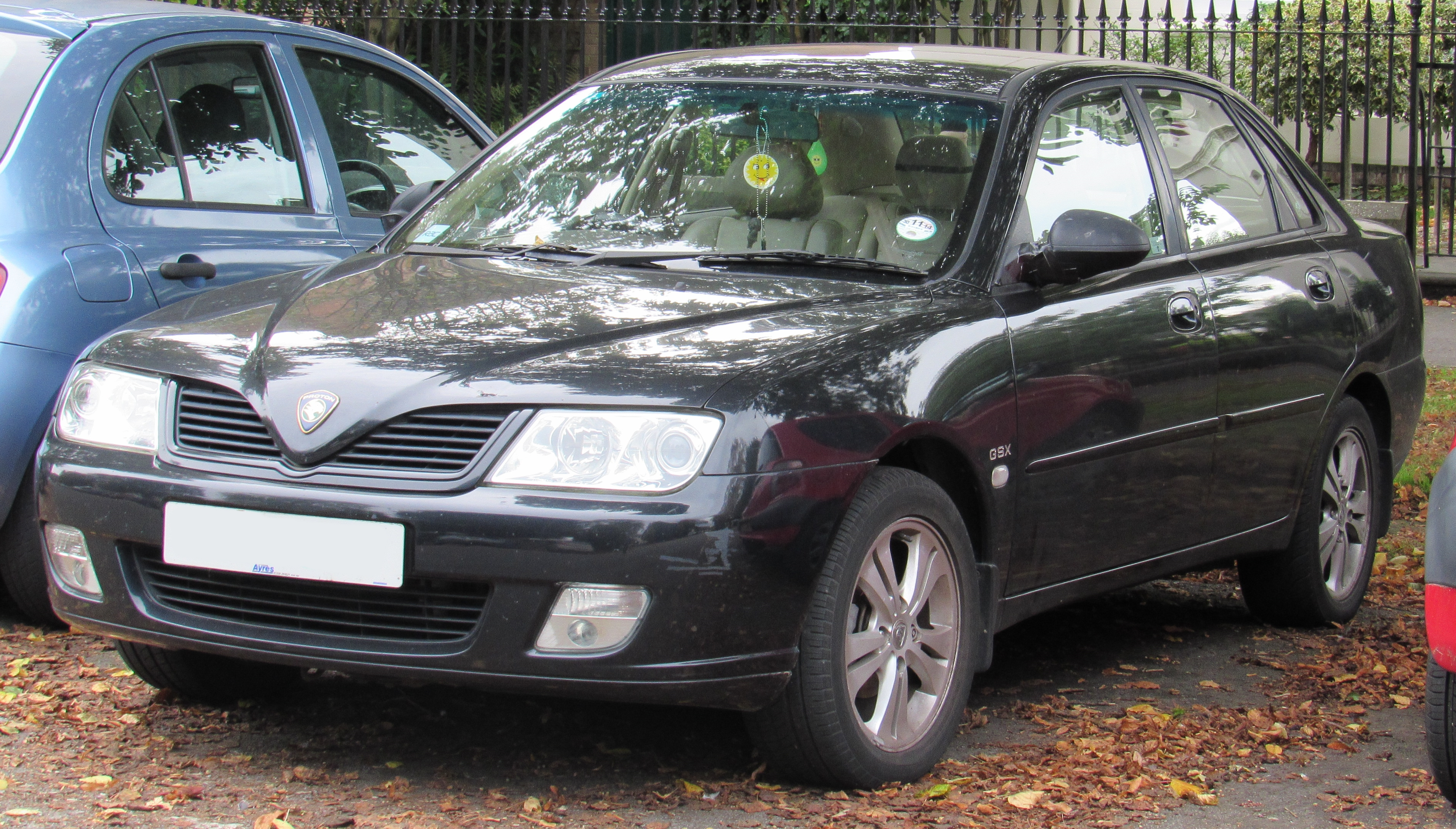

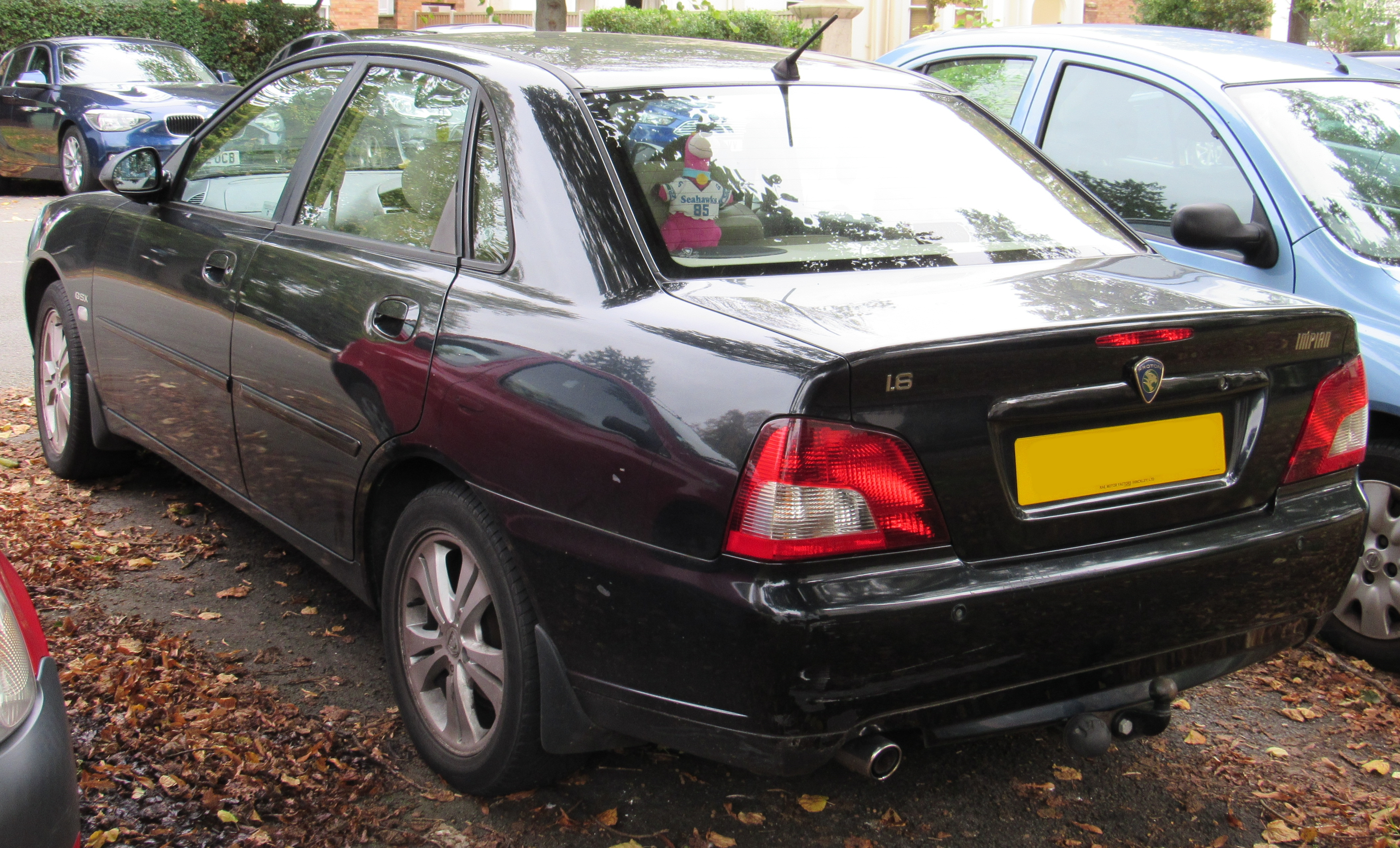
2005 Proton Impian GLS

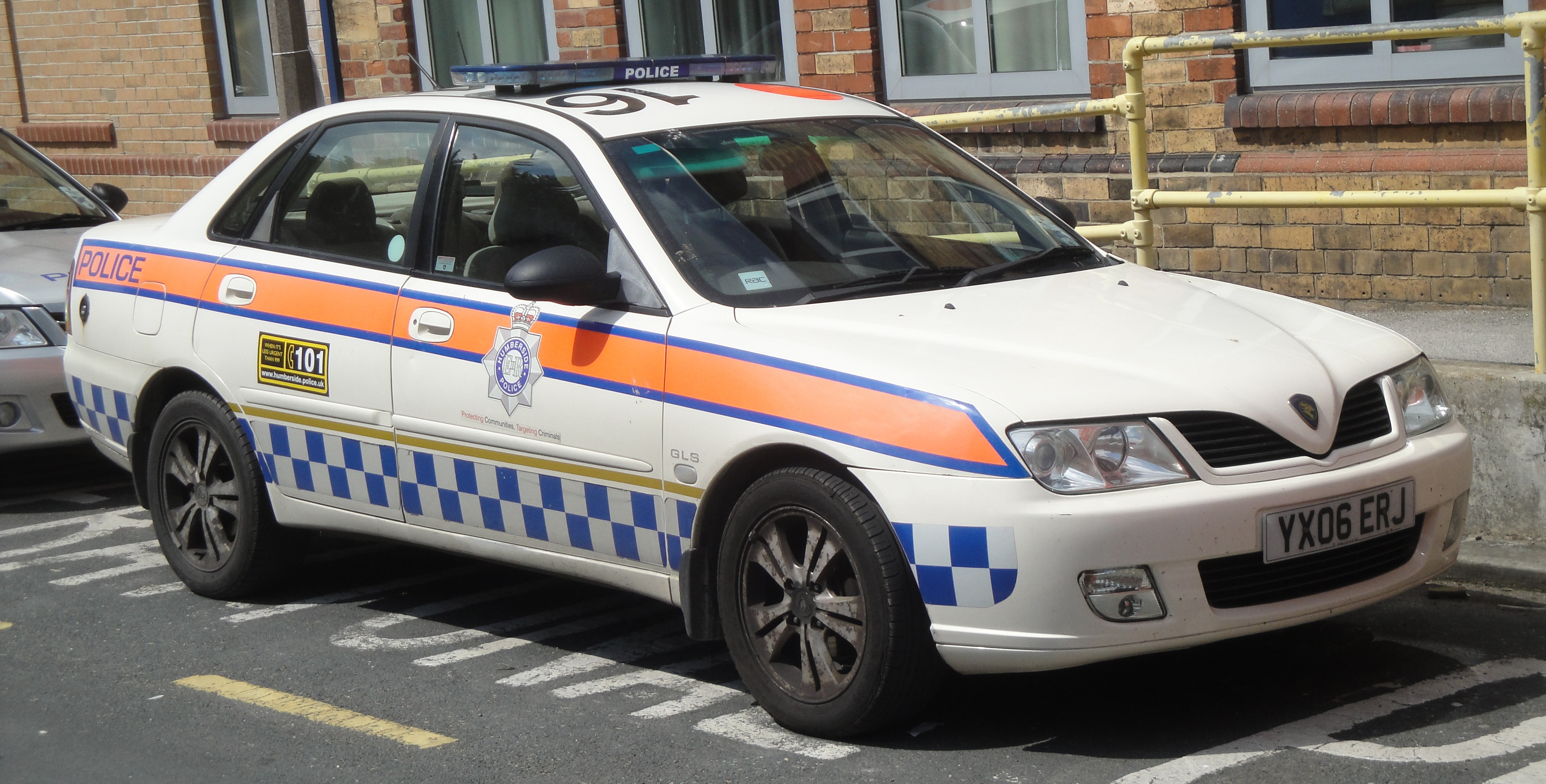
Proton Impian used by Humberside Police

The Proton Waja was sold in the United Kingdom where it was rebadged as the Impian, did not begin until April 2001, and it has continued virtually unchanged until sales ceased in 2008. The Impian was only available with RHD, while LHD models were available elsewhere in Europe.

The Proton Impian was offered with two variants mostly throughout its time in the United Kingdom: GLS and GLX. Both offering manual and automatic transmissions and the GLX being the more premium variant of the two.

Bi-fuel Proton Impians were bought extensively by Humberside Police from 2002 to 2010. These police Impians were delivered with engines converted to run both liquefied petroleum gas and petrol, as part a cost-saving scheme by Humberside to convert the majority of its fleet to LPG power. Humberside Police had previously purchased 120 Proton Personas between 1997 and 2002, which were also converted to bi-fuel powered engines.

Sales were not strong, as it was behind the best of the competition at its launch and virtually all of its competitors were all replaced since. Its decent ride and handling, generous equipment levels, competitive asking price and comprehensive aftersales package were perhaps the only things that kept it going with British buyers.

=== Indonesia ===
The Proton Waja was launched in Indonesia in July 2007 at the 15th Indonesia International Motor Show by PT Proton Edar Indonesia. Only available with one variant with either manual or automatic transmissions with the Campro S4PH engine.

=== Iran ===
5,000+ Proton Waja (Impian) were exported to Iran to be used as taxis.

=== Pakistan ===
The Proton Waja was exported to Pakistan as the Proton Impian, where it was launched in September 2006. It was available in a single variant, with either a manual or an automatic transmission.

== Safety ==
- (European Union) - Euro NCAP -

The Proton Waja / Impian was the first and thus far only Proton car to be officially crash tested by the Euro NCAP in 2002. It scored a three star rating for adult occupant safety, but only one star for pedestrian safety. The tested configuration included four SRS airbags (dual front and dual side), a configuration which was limited to a handful of developed markets such as the United Kingdom and Australia. Malaysian market Proton Wajas never received side airbags.

Proton claimed the Impian was the first of a new generation of cars that were designed to Euro NCAP standards, but after the Impian's disappointing performance, Proton promised to improve on future designs. Ten years later, that promise was fulfilled when the Proton Prevé was awarded the full five stars by Australia's ANCAP, an organization whose methods closely align with that of the Euro NCAP.

Top Gear aired a segment which featured a damaged Proton Waja alongside a damaged Toyota Avensis, to showcase the difference between a three star and a five star Euro NCAP car after a head-on collision with a deformable steel concrete wall.

== Problems ==
Early models had their centre air con vents fail to blow cold air to the front passenger due to a design flaw. Redesigned air con vents in later models solved the problem. Its fuel pump, power windows and exterior door handles proved to be problematic in the early models. Subsequent models, with the redesigned "thermometer" styled taillights were prone to water leaking into their housing and into the rear boot.

It was soon discovered that heat from the brake lights melted the inner plastic housing. The Proton Waja was also subjected to two recalls. The first recall affected only the manual transmission variants, where the bolts used for the manual transmission were incorrectly tightened. The subsequent recall in 2005, involved approximately 3000 units due to defective alloy wheels.

== Specifications ==
| | Mitsubishi 4G18 | Renault F4P | Proton Campro S4PH | Proton Campro CPS |
Powertrain & Performance
| Engine | 16-Valve 4G18P SOHC 5MT | 16-Valve F4P DOHC 4AT | 16-Valve S4PH DOHC 5MT | 16-Valve S4PH DOHC 5MT |
| Maximum Speed (km/h) | 186 km/h | 186 km/h | 190 km/h | 190 km/h |
| Acceleration 0–100 km/h (sec) | 12 sec | 13 sec | 12 sec | 11.5 sec |
| Maximum Output kW(hp)/rpm | 76 kW (102 hp) / 6,000rpm | 88 kW (118 hp) / 5,750rpm | 82 kW (110 hp) / 6,000rpm | 93 kW (125 hp) / 6,500rpm |
| Maximum Torque (Nm/rpm) | 140 Nm / 2,750rpm | 169 Nm / 5,750rpm | 148 Nm / 4,000rpm | 150 Nm / 4,500rpm |
Chassis
| Power Steering | Hydraulic Power Steering | | | |
| Suspension (Front/Rear) | MacPherson Strut with Stabiliser Bar/ Multi-link with Stabiliser Bar | | | |

== Sales ==
| Year | Malaysia (Note: Figures based on registration) |
|---|---|
| 2000 | 10,915 |
| 2001 | 55,890 |
| 2002 | 58,325 |
| 2003 | 43,479 |
| 2004 | 36,824 |
| 2005 | 40,261 |
| 2006 | 21,401 |
| 2007 | 11,017 |
| 2008 | 7,284 |
| 2009 | 3,450 |
| 2010 | 3,583 |
| 2011 | 2,719 |
| 2012 | 705 |
| 2013 | 3 |
