= Mitsubishi 6A1 engine =

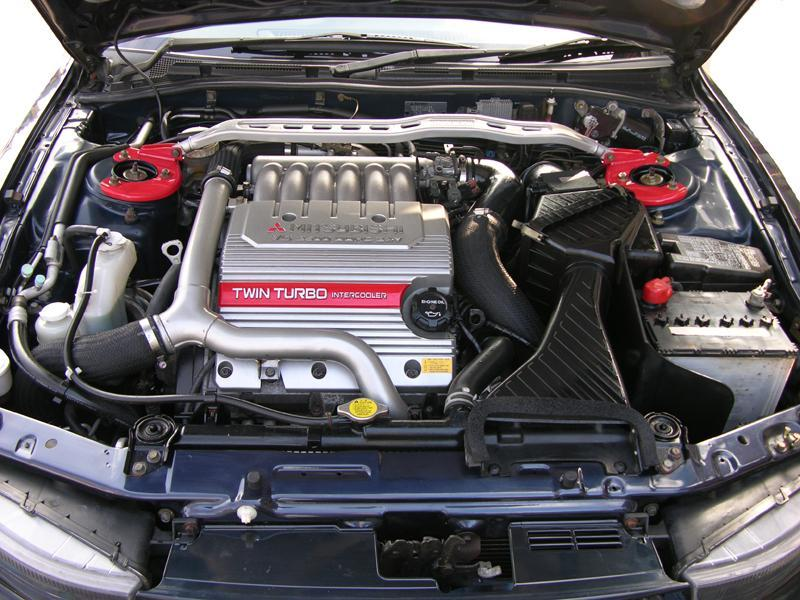

Overview
- Manufacturer: Mitsubishi Motors
- Production: 1992–2009

Layout
- Configuration: V6 engine
- Displacement: 1.6 to 2.5 L (1,597 to 2,498 cc)
- Cylinder bore: 73 mm (2.87 in); 75 mm (2.95 in); 78.4 mm (3.09 in); 81 mm (3.19 in)
- Piston stroke: 63.6 mm (2.50 in); 69 mm (2.72 in); 80.8 mm (3.18 in)
- Cylinder block material: Cast Iron
- Cylinder head material: Aluminium alloy
- Valvetrain: SOHC & DOHC 4 valves x cyl. with MIVEC (some versions)
- Compression ratio: 8.5:1-10.4:1

Combustion
- Turbocharger: Mitsubishi Heavy Industries TD03, TD025M-7G Eterna VR-4/ TD025L-7G (on some versions)
- Fuel system: Multi-port fuel injection
- Fuel type: Gasoline
- Cooling system: Water-cooled

Output
- Power output: 99–228 kW (135–310 PS; 133–306 hp)
- Torque output: 147–363 N⋅m (108–268 lb⋅ft)

The Mitsubishi 6A1 engine is a series of piston V6 engines from Mitsubishi Motors, found in their small and medium vehicles through the 1990s. They ranged from 1.6 to 2.5 L (1,597 to 2,498 cc) in size, and came with a variety of induction methods and cylinder head designs and configurations.

Now out of production, the 1.6 L (1,597 cc) 6A10 is still the smallest modern production V6. The small displacement was offered so Japanese buyers could purchase a powerful engine, while reducing their annual road tax obligation.

== 6A10 ==
- Displacement — 1.6 L (1,597 cc)
- Bore x Stroke — 73 mm × 63.6 mm (2.87 in × 2.50 in)

=== DOHC ===
- Engine type — V type 6-cylinder DOHC 24-valve
- Compression ratio — 10.0:1
- Fuel system — ECI multi
- Peak power — 103 kW (140 PS; 138 hp) at 7000 rpm
- Peak torque — 147 N⋅m (108 lb⋅ft) at 4500 rpm

==== Applications ====
- 1992–1994 Mitsubishi Mirage
- 1992–1998 Mitsubishi Lancer

== 6A11 ==
- Displacement — 1.8 L (1,829 cc)
- Bore x Stroke — 75 mm × 69 mm (2.95 in × 2.72 in)

=== SOHC ===
- Engine type — V type 6-cylinder SOHC 24-valve
- Compression ratio — 9.5:1
- Fuel system — ECI multi
- Peak power — 99 kW (135 PS; 133 hp) at 6000 rpm
- Peak torque — 167 N⋅m (123 lb⋅ft) at 4500 rpm

==== Applications ====
- 1992–96 Mitsubishi Galant/Eterna/Emeraude
- 1995–98 Mitsubishi Mirage

== 6A12 ==
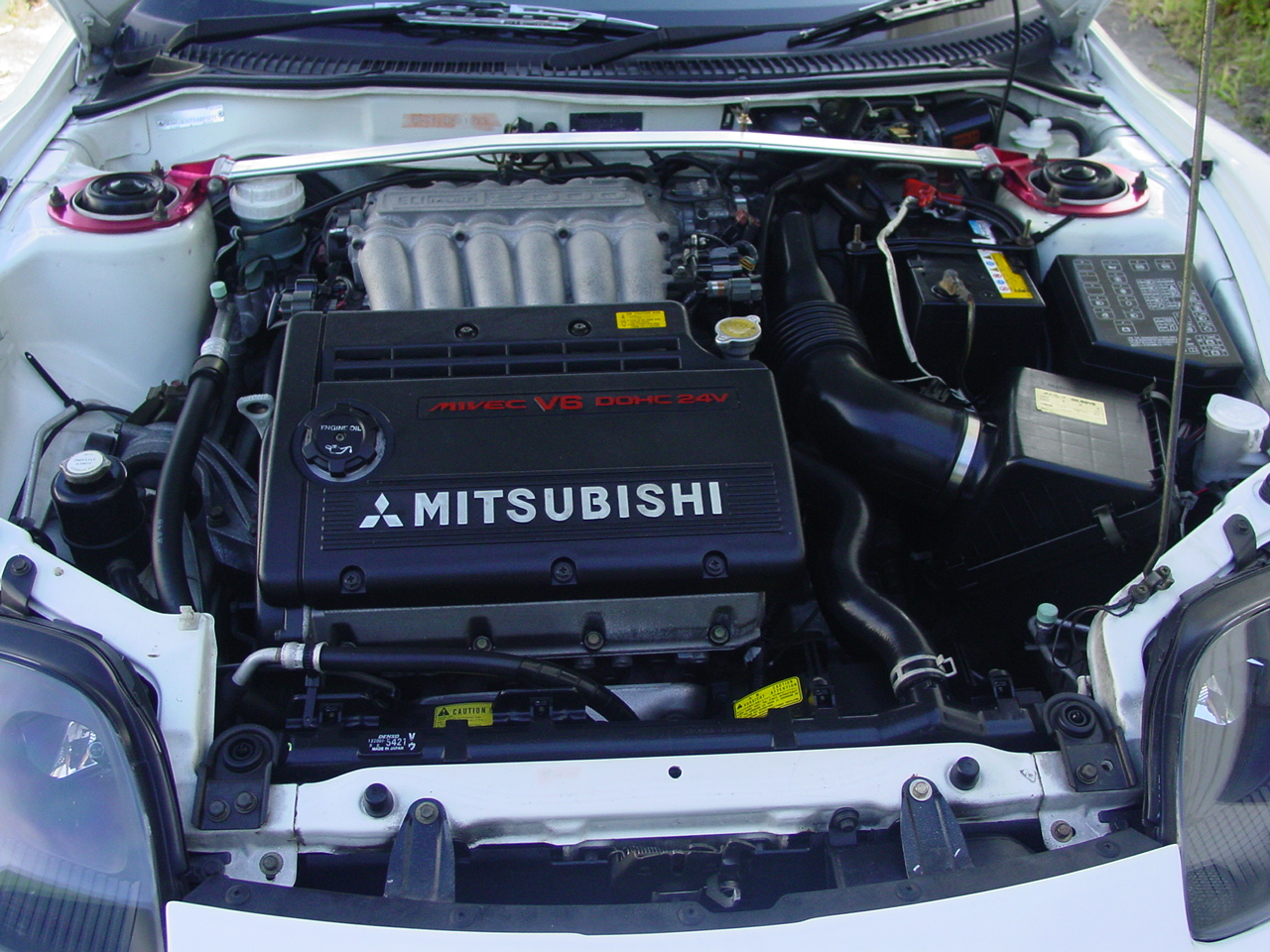
6A12 MIVEC V6 fitted to a Mitsubishi FTO

- Displacement — 2.0 L (1,998 cc)
- Bore x Stroke' — 78.4 mm × 69 mm (3.09 in × 2.72 in)

=== DOHC ===
- Engine type — V type 6-cylinder DOHC 24-valve
- Compression ratio — 9.5:1, 10.0:1, 10.4:1
- Fuel system — ECI multi
- Peak power — 107–110 kW (145–150 PS; 143–148 hp) at 6000–6750
- Peak torque — 179–181 N⋅m (132–133 lb⋅ft) at 4000–4500

==== Applications ====
- 1992-1996 Mitsubishi Galant/Eterna/Emeraude
- 1992-1994 Mitsubishi Diamante
- 1994-2000 Mitsubishi FTO
- 1999-2010 Proton Perdana
- 2005-2009 Proton Waja Chancellor

=== DOHC & sports ECU ===
- Engine type — V type 6-cylinder DOHC 24-valve
- Compression ratio — 10.0:1
- Fuel system — ECI multi
- Peak power (1994–1996) — 127–132 kW (173–179 PS; 170–177 hp) at 7000 rpm
- Peak torque — 191 N⋅m (141 lb⋅ft) at 4000 rpm

==== Applications ====
- 1994–2000 Mitsubishi FTO
- 1992–1996 Mitsubishi Galant/Eterna/Emeraude

=== MIVEC ===
- Engine type — V type 6-cylinder DOHC 24-valve MIVEC
- Compression ratio — 10.0:1
- Fuel system — ECI multi
- Peak power — 147 kW (200 PS; 197 hp) at 7500 rpm
- Peak torque — 200 N⋅m (148 lb⋅ft) at 6500 rpm

==== Applications ====
- 1994–2000 Mitsubishi FTO
- 1993–2002 Mitsubishi Galant

=== DOHC Twin Turbo ===
- Engine Type — V Type 6-Cylinder QUADCAM 24-Valve
- Compression Ratio — 8.5:1
- Fuel System — ECI Multi
- Injector Size — 275 cc (16.8 cu in)
- Peak Power — 158–177 kW (215–241 PS; 212–237 hp) at 6000 rpm
- Peak Torque — 309 N⋅m (228 lb⋅ft) at 4000 rpm
- Turbocharger Model — Mitsubishi Heavy Industries TD025M-7G Eterna VR-4/ TD025L-7G Mitsubishi Galant Sports GT 1994

==== Applications ====
- 1994 Mitsubishi Galant Sports GT VR-4 TD025L-7G
- 1992–96 Mitsubishi Galant VR-4 — E84A
- 1992–96 Mitsubishi Eterna XX-4/GT — E84A
- 1994-1996 Mitsubishi Galant Sports GT (E50-E60-E70-E80)

Accelerations:

- 0-80 km/h (50 mph) (sec):4.3
- 0-100 km/h (62 mph) (sec):6.4
- 0-160 km/h (99 mph) (sec):15.6
- 0-200 km/h (120 mph) (sec):29
- 0-300 km/h (190 mph) (sec):
- 0-50 mph (80 km/h) (sec):4.4
- 0-60 mph (97 km/h) (sec):6.1
- 0-100 mph (160 km/h) (sec):15.8
- 0-150 mph (240 km/h) (sec):
- 0-200 mph (320 km/h) (sec):

== 6A13 ==
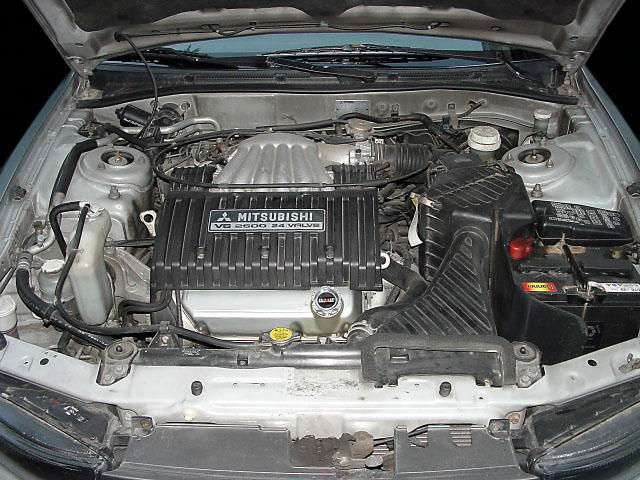
6A13 V6 fitted to a Mitsubishi Galant

- Displacement — 2.5 L (2,498 cc)
- Bore x Stroke — 81 mm × 80.8 mm (3.19 in × 3.18 in)

=== SOHC ===
- Engine type — V type 6-cylinder SOHC 24-valve
- Compression ratio — 9.0, 9.5:1
- Fuel system — ECI multi
- Peak power — 120–129 kW (163–175 PS; 161–173 hp) at 5750 rpm
- Peak torque — 223–230 N⋅m (164–170 lb⋅ft) at 4500 rpm

==== Applications ====
- 1996–2003 Mitsubishi Galant/Legnum
- 2002–2005 Mitsubishi Diamante

=== Twin Turbo DOHC ===
- Engine Type — V Type 6-Cylinder DOHC 24-Valve
- Compression Ratio — 8.5:1
- Fuel System — MPI Mitsubishi ECI Multi
- Peak Power — 191–228 kW (260–310 PS; 256–306 hp) at 5500 rpm
- Peak Torque — 343–367 N⋅m (253–271 lb⋅ft) at 4000 rpm
- Turbocharger Model — Mitsubishi TD03-7T
- Injector Size — 390 cc (24 cu in)

==== Applications ====
- 1996–2003 Mitsubishi Galant/Legnum VR-4 — EC5A/EC5W

Accelerations:

- 0-80 km/h (50 mph) (sec):3.7
- 0-100 km/h (62 mph) (sec):5.3
- 0-160 km/h (99 mph) (sec):13.3
- 0-200 km/h (120 mph) (sec):23.2

== See also ==
- Mitsubishi Motors engines
