= Mitsubishi V3000 =

The Mitsubishi V3000 is a mid-size car that was sold by the Mitsubishi Motors, New Zealand (MMC) between 1988 and 1996 in New Zealand. Mitsubishi utilised the V3000 nameplate on two different vehicles:

- First generation (1988–1991): the V3000 name originally applied to a 3.0-litre V6 engine version of the Mitsubishi Galant manufactured locally in New Zealand between 1988 and 1991. This model was intended to sit above the heavily related, but wider 2.6-litre inline-four engined Mitsubishi Magna (TN/TP) sourced from Australia.
- Second generation (1991–1996): the V3000 name was transferred to the Australian sourced Mitsubishi Verada (KR/KS) with 3.0-litre V6.

After 1996, Mitsubishi Motors in New Zealand adopted the international Mitsubishi Diamante nameplate for the V6 engined successor model.

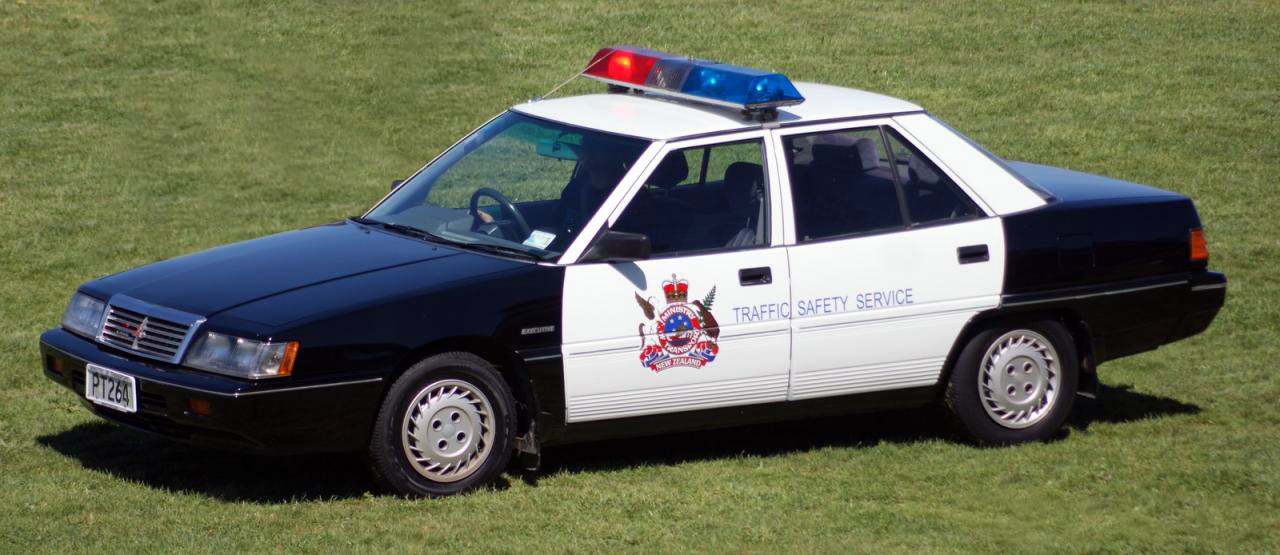
First generation (1988–1991)

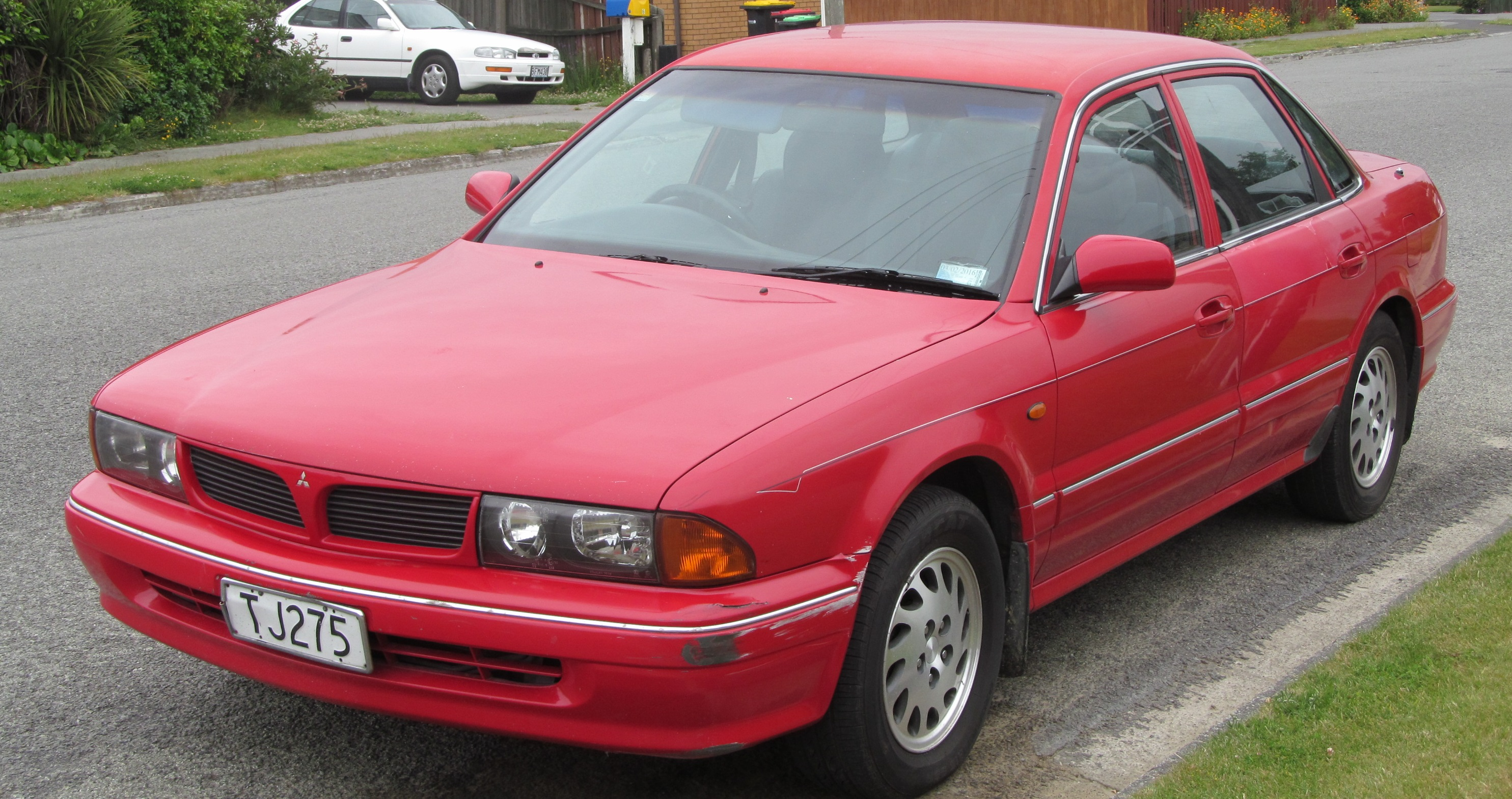
Second generation (1991–1996)
